The list of marine animals of the Cape Peninsula and False Bay is a list of marine and shore-based species that form a part of the fauna of South Africa. This list includes animals which either live entirely marine lives, or which spend critical parts of their lives at sea.

The geographical range is from Bloubergstrand at the north of Table Bay to Cape Hangklip, the south eastern limit of False Bay, in the Western Cape province of South Africa and includes the Table Mountain National Park Marine Protected Area and the Helderberg Marine Protected Area.

Sponges

Calcarea – lime sponges

Order Leucosolenida

Family Sycettidae
Hairy tube sponge, Sycon spp. (Saldanha Bay to Kosi Bay)

Family Leucosoleniidae
Branching ball sponge, Leucosolenia sp. (Cape Peninsula to Cape Agulhas)
Tube sponge, Leucosolenia sp. (Port Nolloth to Sodwana Bay)

Demospongiae – fibre or horny sponges

Order Astrophorida

Family Ancorinidae
Grey wall sponge, Stelletta agulhana Lendenfield, 1907 (Northern Cape to KwaZulu-Natal)

Order Hadromerida

Family Clionaidae
Rosetted sponge, Cliona aff. celata (Namibia to Cape Peninsula)
Boring sponge, Cliona celata Grant, 1826 (Luderitz to Durban)

Family Polymastiidae
Teat-sponge, Polymastia mamillaris (Müller, 1806) (Saldanha Bay to Port St. Johns)
Atlantic teat-sponge, Polymastia atlantica Samaai & Gibbons, 2005 (Luderitz to Cape Peninsula)

Family Trachycladidae
Orange wall sponge, Trachycladus spinispirulifera (Carter, 1879) (Cape Peninsula to Cape Agulhas)

Family Suberitidae
Dusty sponge, Suberites aff. ficus (both side of the Cape Peninsula, also southern Namibia, Mediterranean, Pacific and north Atlantic)

Family Tethyidae
Golf ball sponge, Tethya aurantium (Luderitz to Durban)

Order Halichondrida

Family Halichondriidae
Crumb-of-bread-sponge, Hymeniacidon perlevis (Montagu, 1818) (Northern Cape to Port St. Johns, also north Atlantic, Mediterranean and the Pacific)

Order Poecilosclerida

Family Chondropsidae
Scroll sponge, Chondropsis sp. (Olifants River to Cape Peninsula)

Family Crambeidae
Stellar sponge, Crambe acuata (Lévi, 1958) syn. Crambe chelastra (Luderitz to Cape Peninsula)

Family Latrunculiidae
Vented sponge, Latrunculia (Biannulata) spinispiraefera Brøndsted, 1924 (Angola to Durban)

Family Isodictyidae
Brain sponge, Isodictya elastica (Vosmaer, 1880) (West Coast to Port Elizabeth)(Luderitz to Cape Point)
Flat leaf sponge, Isodictya grandis (Ridley & Dendy, 1886) (West Coast to False Bay)
Fanned kelp sponge, Isodictya frondosa (Lévi, 1963) (Orange river to Cape Point)

Family Microcionidae
Broad-bladed tree sponge, Clathria (Clathria) dayi Levi, 1963 (West Coast to the Cape Peninsula)
Red encrusting sponge, Clathria (Isociella) oudekraalensis Samaai & Gibbons, 2005 (Cape Peninsula)
Tree sponge, Echinoclathria dichotoma (Levi, 1963) (West Coast to Cape Agulhas)
Nodular sponge, Clathria (Thalysias) hooperi Samaai & Gibbons, 2005 (Cape Peninsula)

Family Desmacellidae
Yellow encrusting sponge, Biemna anisotoxa Levi, 1963 (West Coast to Port Elizabeth)

Order Haplosclerida

Family Chalinidae
Turret sponge, Haliclona (Haliclona) anonyma (Stephens, 1915) (Cape Peninsula to Sodwana Bay)
Encrusting turret sponge, Haliclona (Haliclona) stilensis Burton, 1933 (West and South Coasts)

Order Dictyoceratida

Family Irciniidae
Black stink sponge, Ircinia arbuscula (Hyatt, 1877) (syn. Sarcotragus australis) (Cape Peninsula to Cape Agulhas, also Australia)
Sand cup sponge, Psammocinia cf. arenosa (Orange River to Cape Peninsula)

Cnidarians

Anthozoa

Hexacorallians

Order: Actiniaria – Anemones
Family Halcampidae
Brooding anemone, Halianthella annularis Carlgren, 1938 (Lamberts Bay to Cape Agulhas, endemic)

Family Sagartiidae
Striped anemone, Anthothoe chilensis(Lesson, 1830) (Luderitz to Richards Bay, also Argentina, Brazil, Chile and St. Helena)
Square-mouth striped anemone, Anthothoe sp. (False Bay) (still being described)

Family Actiniidae
Violet-spotted anemone, Anthostella stephensoni Carlgren, 1938 (Luderitz to Richards Bay, endemic)
Dwarf-spotted anemone, Anthostella n. sp. (Cape Peninsula to Port Elizabeth, possibly endemic) (still being described)
Knobbly anemone, Bunodosoma capensis (Lesson, 1830) (Luderitz to Durban)
False plum anemone, Pseudactinia flagellifera (Drayton in Dana, 1846) (Luderitz to Durban)
Long-tentacled anemone, Anthopleura michaelseni (Pax, 1920) (Luderitz to Durban)
Spinnaker anemone, Korsaranthus natalensis (Carlgren, 1938) (False Bay to Durban)
Sandy anemone, Bunodactis reynaudi (Milne-Edwards, 1857) (Luderitz to Durban) (syn. Aulactinia reynaudi)
Clown anemone undescribed (False Bay)

Family Preactiidae
Walking anemone, sock anemone Preactis millardae England in England & Robson, 1984 (Cape Peninsula)

Family Isanthidae
Ring-tentacle anemone, Isanthus capensis Carlgren, 1938 (South African Atlantic coast)

Order Corallimorpharia
Family Corallimorphidae
Strawberry anemone, Corynactis annulata (Verrill, 1867) (Port Nolloth to Mossel Bay)

Order Zoanthids
Family Parazoanthidae
Cape zoanthid, Isozoanthus capensis (Cape Peninsula to Port St Johns)
Sponge zoanthid, Parazoanthus sp. (False Bay)

Order Cerianthids
Family Cerianthidae
Burrowing anemone, Ceriantheopsis austroafricanus Molodtsova, Griffiths and Acuna 2012 (False Bay and Hermanus)
White burrowing anemone Ceriantheopsis nikitai Molodtsova, 2001 (Table Bay)

Octocorallians

Order Scleractinia
Family Dendrophylliidae
Cup coral, Balanophyllia (Balanophyllia) bonaespei van der Horst, 1938 (Saldanha Bay to East London)

Family Caryophylliidae
Large cup coral, Caryophyllia sp. (False Bay)

Order Alcyonacea – soft corals
Family Alcyoniidae
Purple soft coral, Alcyonium fauri Studer, 1910 (Saldanha Bay to Richards Bay)
Valdivian soft coral, Alcyonium valdiviae Kukenthal, 1906 (Cape Peninsula to northern KwaZulu-Natal)
Variable soft coral, Eleutherobia variabile (J.S. Thomson, 1921) (Cape Peninsula to northern KwaZulu-Natal) (syn. Alcyonium variabile)
Sun-burst soft coral, Malacacanthus capensis (Hickson, 1900) (Cape Peninsula to southern KwaZulu-Natal)

Family Gorgoniidae
Flagellar sea fan, whip fan, Eunicella albicans (Kolliker, 1875) (Cape Peninsula to Port Elizabeth)
Nippled sea fan, Eunicella papillosa (Esper, 1797) (Luderitz to Sodwana)
Sinuous sea fan, Eunicella tricoronata Velimirov, 1971 (Cape Peninsula to East London)
Palmate sea fan, Leptogorgia palma (Pallas, 1766) (Cape Peninsula to Sodwana)

Family Nephtheidae
Cauliflower soft coral, Eunephthya thyrsoidea (Verrill, 1865) (Cape Peninsula to northern KwaZulu-Natal)

Order Pennatulacea – sea pens
Family Echinoptilidae
Radial sea pen, purple sea pen, Actinoptylum molle (Kukenthal, 1902) (whole South African coast)

Family Virgulariidae
Feathery sea pen, Virgularia schultzei Kukenthal, 1910 (Luderitz to central Mozambique)

Order Alcyonacea – sea fans
Family Anthothelidae
Gorgonian twig coral, Homophyton verrucosum (Mobius, 1861) (False Bay to Sodwana)

Family Melithaeidae
Multicoloured sea fan, Acabaria rubra Esper, 1789 (Bloubergstrand to East London)

Medusozoa

Staurozoa

Order Stauromedusae
family Depastridae
Stalked trumpet jelly, Depastromorpha africana Carlgren, 1935 (Cape Peninsula to Hermanus)

Family Lipkeidae
Bell stalked jelly, Lipkea stephensoni Carlgren, 1933 (Smitswinkel Bay)

Scyphozoa – true jellyfish

Order Semaeostomeae
Family Pelagiidae
Compass jellyfish, Chrysaora hysoscella (Linnaeus, 1767) (pelagic, Atlantic Ocean)
Night-light jellyfish, Pelagia noctiluca (Forsskal, 1775) (pelagic, Atlantic Ocean, also Mediterranean and Pacific)

Order Rhizostomeae
Family Rhizostomatidae
Frilly-mouthed jellyfish, Rhizostoma pulmo Macri, 1778 (pelagic, Atlantic Ocean)
Root-mouthed jellyfish, Eupilema inexpectata Pages, Gili & Bouillon, 1992 (pelagic, Atlantic Ocean)

Order Carybdeida
Family Carybdeidae
Box jellyfish, sea wasp, Carybdea branchi (north of Namibia to Port Elizabeth)

Hydrozoans

Order Anthoathecata

Family Candelabridae
Gnome's hat hydroid, Candelabrum capensis (Manton, 1940) (Luderitz to East London) syn. Myriothela capensis
Dreadlocks hydroid, Candelabrum tentaculatum Millard, 1966 (Cape Peninsula and Port Elizabeth) syn. Myriothela tentaculata

Family Eudendriidae
Bushy hydroids, Eudendrium spp. (whole coast)

Family Hydractiniidae
High-spined commensal hydroid, Hydractinia altispina Millard, 1955 (Luderitz to False Bay)
Shell-mimic hydroid, Hydrocorella africana Stechow, 1921 (West Coast to Durban)

Family Porpitidae
Blue button, Porpita porpita (Port Nolloth to Mozambique, pelagic, warm waters.)
By-the-wind sailor, Velella velella (Port Nolloth to Mozambique, pelagic, warm waters.)

Family Solanderiidae
Grey fan hydroid, Solanderia procumbens (Carter, 1873) (Cape Peninsula to KwaZulu-Natal)

Family Stylasteridae
Noble coral, Stylaster nobilis (Saville Kent, 1871) (Cape Peninsula to Port Elizabeth) syn. Allopora nobilis

Family Tubulariidae
Tubular hydroid, Ectopleura crocea (Agassiz, 1862) (Saldanha Bay to Sodwana Bay)
Tubular sponge hydroid, Zyzzyzus warreni (Warren, 1906) (Saldanha Bay to Sodwana Bay) syn. Zyzzyzus solitarius Calder, 1988

Order: Leptothecata
Family Aequoreidae
Crystal jellyfish, Aequorea sp. (pelagic, whole coast)

Family Aglaopheniidae
Toothed feather hydroid, Aglaophenia pluma (Linnaeus, 1767) (whole coast)
Smoky feather hydroid, Macrorhynchia filamentosa (Lamarck, 1816) syn. Lytocarpus filamentosus(Walvis Bay to Durban)

Family Campanulariidae
Thin-walled obelia, Obelia dichotoma (Linnaeus, 1758) (Cosmopolitan. Alien, introduced on ships)
Obelia geniculata (Linnaeus, 1758) (Luderitz to Cape Agulhas)

Family Halopterididae
Fine hydroid, Corhiza scotiae (Ritchie, 1907) (whole coast)
Snowdrop hydroid, Gattya humilis Allman, 1886 (northern Namibia to KwaZulu-Natal)

Family Kirchenpaueriidae 
Feathery hydroid, Pycnotheca mirabilis (Allman, 1883) (False Bay to KwaZulu-Natal)
Kirchenpaueria pinnata (Linnaeus, 1758) *Namibia to KwaZulu-Natal)

Family Plumulariidae
Plumed hydroid, little sea bristle, Plumularia setacea (Linnaeus, 1758) (whole coast)

Family Sertulariidae
Jointed hydroid, Thuiaria articulata (Pallas, 1766) (whole coast) syn, Salacia articulata
Planar hydroid, Sertularella arbuscula (Lamouroux, 1816) (Saldanha Bay to southern Mozambique)
Wiry hydroid, Amphisbetia operculata (Linnaeus, 1758) (Luderitz to Durban)

Order Siphonophorae
Family Apolemiidae
String jelly, barbed wire jellyfish, Apolemia uvaria (Lesueur, 1815) (pelagic, worldwide)

Family Forskaliidae
Net jelly, Forskalia edwardsi (Kolliker, 1853) (pelagic, worldwide)

Family Physaliidae
Bluebottle, Portuguese man-of-war, Physalia utriculus (La Martiniere, 1787) (pelagic, whole coast)

Ctenophora – comb jellies

Order Beroida
Family Beroidae
Cigar comb jelly, Beroe cucumis spp. (pelagic, worldwide)

Order Cestida
Family Cestidae
Venus' girdle, Cestum veneris Lesueur, 1813 (pelagic, worldwide)

Order Cydippida
Family Pleurobrachiidae
Sea gooseberry, Pleurobrachia bachei Agassiz, 1860 (pelagic, worldwide)

Order Lobata
Family Bolinopsidae
Lobed comb jelly, Leucothea spp. (pelagic, worldwide)

Worms

Platyhelminthes – flatworms

Order Polycladida
Family Pseudocerotidae
Carpet flatworm, Thysanozoon brocchii (Risso, 1818) Grube, 1840 (Cape Peninsula to Port Elizabeth)

Incertae sedis
Acoel flatworm, sponge flatworm. Undescribed. (Both sides of the Cape Peninsula)
Striped flatworm. Undescribed. (Cape Peninsula and Port Elizabeth)
Freckled flatworm. Undescribed. (Both sides of the Cape Peninsula)

Polychaeta – bristleworms, annelids

Order Eunicida
Family Eunicidae
Wonder worm, Bobbit worm, Eunice aphroditois (Pallas, 1788) (Luderitz to Sodwana Bay)

Order Myzostomida
Family Myzostomidae
Crinoid worm, Myzostoma fuscomaculatum Lanterbeque, 2008 (False Bay)

Order Terebellida
Family Cirratulidae
Black boring worm, Dodecaceria pulchra Day, 1955 (Luderitz to Port Elizabeth)
Orange thread-gilled worm, Cirriformia capensis (Schmarda, 1861) syn. Timarete capensis, Cirratulus capensis, Cirratulus australis Stimpson, 1856 (Angola to Durban)

Family Terebellidae
Sand mason, lollipop worm, Lanice conchilega Pallas, 1766 (False Bay to Port Elizabeth, also northern oceans)
Tangleworms family Terebellidae Mamlgren, 1867 (whole coast)

Order Sabellida
Family Sabellidae
Branchiomma natalensis (Kinberg, 1866), (Luderitz to Cape Point)
Branchiomma violacea (Schmarda, 1861), (Walvis Bay to Durban)
Feather-duster worm, Pseudobranchiomma longa (Kinberg, 1866) syn. Sabellastarte longa (Cape Peninsula to Mozambique)
Peacock fanworm, pencilworm, Sabella spallanzanii (Gmelin, 1791) syn. Sabella penicillus (as S. penicillus, False Bay to southern KwaZulu-Natal)
Gregarious fanworm, Pseudopotamilla reniformis (Muller, 1771) (Port Nolloth to southern Mozambique)

Family Serpulidae
Spiral fanworms family Serpulidae Rafinesque, 1815 (whole coast)
Red fanworm, mopworm Protula bispiralis (Savigny, 1822) (Cape Point to Durban)
Operculate fanworm, Serpula vermicularis Linnaeus, 1767 (Port Nolloth to southern Mozambique)
Filigreed coral-worm, Filograna implexa Berkeley, 1835 (Port Nolloth to Port Elizabeth)

Arthropods

Pycnogonida – sea spiders

Order Pantopoda
Family Ammotheidae
Compact sea spider, Tanystylum brevipes (Hoek, 1881) (Orange River mouth to Richards Bay)

Family Nymphonidae
Scarlet sea spider, Nymphon signatum Mobius, 1902 (Saldanha to East London)

Superfamily Ascorhynchoidea family incertae sedis
Yellow sea spider, Queubus jamesanus Barnard 1946 (Cape Peninsula to Port St. Johns)

Crustacea

Order Stomatopoda – mantis shrimps
Family Lysiosquillidae
Cape mantis shrimp, Lysiosquilla capensis Hansen, 1895 (Cape Point to Port Elizabeth)

Order Decapoda
Infraorder Achelata
Family Palinuridae
West Coast rock lobster, Jasus lalandii (H. Milne-Edwards, 1837) (Walvis Bay to Port Elizabeth)

Infraorder Caridea – benthic prawns
Family Alpheidae
Cracker shrimp, Alpheus crassimanus Heller, 1865(Saldanha Bay to Delagoa Bay)

Family Hippolytidae
Crinoid shrimp, feather star shrimp Hippolyte catagrapha d'Udekem d'Acoz, 2007 (False Bay) 
Broken-backed shrimp, Hippolyte kraussiana Stimpson, 1860 (Saldanha Bay to East London)

Family Palaemonidae
Sand shrimp, Palaemon peringueyi (Macpherson, 1990) (Walvis Bay to Port St Johns)

Infraorder Anomura – hermit crabs
Family Diogenidae
Striated hermit crab, Dardanus arrosor (Herbst, 1796) (False Bay to southern Mozambique)
Pink hermit crab, Paguristes gamianus (H. Milne-Edwards, 1836) (southern Namibia to Port Elizabeth)

Family Paguridae
Blue-striped hermit crab, Pagurus liochele (Barnard, 1947) (False Bay to Port Elizabeth)

Infraorder Brachyura – true crabs
Family Calappidae
Masked crab, Mursia cristiata H. Milne-Edwards, 1837 (Saldanha Bay to Sodwana Bay) synonym Mursia cristimanus

Family Plagusiidae
Cape rock crab, Guinusia chabrus (Linnaeus, 1758) (Luderitz to Sodwana Bay) synonym Plagusia chabrus

Family Portunidae
Three-spot swimming crab, Ovalipes trimaculatus (De Haan, 1833) (Luderitz to Durban)

Family Pilumnoididae
Kelp crab, Pilumnoides rubus Guinot & MacPherson, 1987 (Namibian border to Cape Peninsula)

Family Hymenosomatidae
Crown crab, Hymenosoma orbiculare Desmarest, 1825 (Namibian border to southern Mozambique)

Family Dromiidae
Cryptic sponge crab, Platydromia spongiosa (Stimpson, 1858) (Namibian border to Sodwana Bay) syn. Cryptodromiopsis spongiosa
Furred sponge crab, Pseudodromia latens Stimpson, 1858 (Saldanha Bay to East London)
Sumo crab, scrubbing-brush crab, Dromidia aegibotus Barnard, 1947 (Cape Peninsula to Port Elizabeth)
Shaggy sponge crab, Dromidia hirsutissima (Lamarck, 1818) (Southern Namibia to Mossel Bay)

Family Inachidae
Cape long-legged spider crab, Macropodia falcifera (Stimpson, 1857) (cape Peninsula to East London)
Hotlips spider crab, Achaeopsis spinulosa Stimpson, 1857 (False Bay to Durban)

Family Epialtidae
Toothed decorator crab, Dehaanius dentatus (Milne-Edwards, ?1862) (Saldanha Bay to Richards Bay)
Agulhas spider crab, Maja capensis (Ortmann, 1894) (False Bay to Port Elizabeth) syn. Mamaia capensis

Order Mysidacea – mysid shrimps
Family Mysidae
Surf mysid, Gastrosaccus psammodytes O. Tattersall, 1958 (Namibian border to Durban)
Kelp mysid, Mysidopsis major (Zimmer, 1928) (Luderitz to False Bay)

Order Amphipoda
Family Cyproideidae
Ornate amphipod, Cyproidea ornata Haswell, 1879 (Namibian coast to Kosi Bay)

Family Iphimediidae
Hunchback amphipod, Iphimedia gibba Barnard, 1940 (Cape Peninsula to Port Elizabeth)

Family Dexaminidae
Sea squirt amphipod, Polycheria atolli Walker, 1905 (whole coast)

Family Caprellidae
Skeleton shrimp, Caprella sp. (whole coast)

Order Isopoda
Family Idoteidae
Reticulate kelp louse, Paridotea reticulata Barnard, 1914 (Namibian border to Cape Peninsula)

Family Cymothoidae
Fish louse, Anilocra capensis Leach, 1818 (Walvis Bay to Durban)

Family Anthuridae
Slender chequered isopod, Mesanthura catenula (Stimpson, 1855) (Lamberts Bay to KwaZulu-Natal)

Family Sphaeromatidae
Spherical isopod, Exosphaeroma spp. (whole Namibian coast to cape Peninsula)

Infraclass Cirripedia – barnacles
Order Scalpellomorpha
Family Lepadidae
Goose barnacle, Lepas sp. (pelagic)

Order Sessilia
Family Balanidae
Giant barnacle, Austromegabalanus cylindricus (Gmelin, 1780) (Port Nolloth to Port Elizabeth)
White dwarf barnacle, Notomegabalanus algicola (Pilsbry, 1916) (Namibia to Port St Johns)
Striped barnacle, Balanus amphitrite Darwin, 1854 (Saldanha Bay to Mozambique)

Bryozoans – moss animals, lace animals

Order Cheilostomatida
Family Adeonellidae
Forked false coral, Adeonella spp. (Namibian border to Durban)

Family Adeonidae
Pore-plated false coral, Laminopora jellyae (Levinsen, 1909) (Cape Peninsula to East London)

Family Beaniidae
Magellanic lace animal, Beania magellanica (Busk, 1852) (Cape Peninsula to East London)
Beania vanhoeffeni Kluge, 1914 (Cape Peninsula)
Beania minuspina Florence, Hayward & Gibbons, 2007 (Cape Peninsula)

Family Bugulidae
Dentate moss animal, Bugula dentata (Lamouroux, 1816) (Cape Peninsula to Sodwana Bay, Indo-Pacific and Brazil)
Eyelash moss animal, bonsai bush, Bicellariella bonsai Florence, Hayward & Gibbons, 2007 (Port Nolloth to Port St Johns)
Tree moss animal, Bugula plumosa (Pallas, 1766) (Both sides of the Cape Peninsula, Great Britain)
Fouling moss animal, Bugula neritina (Linnaeus, 1758) (Olifants River to Sodwana Bay, Almost worldwide)
Bird's head moss animal, Bugula avicularia (Linnaeus, 1758) (Cape Peninsula to Durban)
Fan-shaped moss animal, Bugula flabellata (Thompson, in Gray, 1848) (Namibian border to Algoa Bay)

Family Calwelliidae
Busk's moss animal, Onchoporella buskii (Harmer, 1923) (Port Nolloth to Algoa Bay, endemic)

Family Candidae
Fern moss animal, Menipea crispa (Pallas, 1766) (Lambert's Bay to Durban)
Spiral moss animal, Menipea triseriata Busk, 1852 (Namibian border to Port St Johns)

Family Celleporidae
Cylindrical false coral, Turbicellepora redoutei (Audouin, 1826) syn. Cellepora cylindriformis (Port Nolloth to Port St. Johns)

Family Chaperiidae
Scrolled false coral, Chaperia spp. (Namibian border to Sodwana Bay)

Family Electridae
Verticellate lace animal, Electra pilosa (Linnaeus, 1767) (Namibian border to East London)

Family Exochellidae
Escharoides contorta (Busk, 1854) (Cape Town to KwaZulu-Natal)

Family Flustridae
Leafy moss animal, Flustra spp. (Both sides of Cape Peninsula. North Atlantic)

Family Gigantoporidae
Staghorn false coral, Gigantopora polymorpha (Busk, 1884) (Port Nolloth to Cape Infanta)

Family Lanceoporidae
Calyptotheca nivea (Busk, 1884) (Cape Point to East London)

Family Lepraliellidae
Spiny false coral, Celleporaria capensis (O'Donoghue & de Watteville, 1935) (Cape Peninsula to Algoa Bay)

Family Margarettidae
Cactus-bush brryozoan, Margaretta levinseni (Canu & Bassler, 1930) (Cape Peninsula to Port Elizabeth)

Family Membraniporidae
Membranous lace animal, Jellyella tuberculata (Bosc, 1802) (Saldanha Bay to Durban) syn. Membranipora tuberculata
Rectangular membranous lace animal, Membranipora rustica Florence, Hayward & Gibbons, 2007 (Namibian border to Durban)

Family Phidoloporidae
Lacy false coral, Schizoretepora tessellata (Hincks, 1878) (Namibian border to Mossel Bay and Australia)

Family Steginoporellidae
Steginoporella buskii Harmer, 1900 (Port Nolloth to Durban)

Family Watersiporidae
Sub-ovoid bryozoan, Watersipora subovoidea (d'Orbigny, 1852) (Namibian border to Sodwana Bay)
Red-rust bryozoan Watersipora subtorquata (d'Orbigny, 1852) (Cape Columbine to Mossel Bay)

Order Ctenostomatida
Family Alcyonidiidae
Nodular bryozoan, Alcyonidium nodosum O'Donoghue & Watteville, 1944 (Port Nolloth to False Bay)
Soft false coral, Alcyonidium rhomboidale O'Donoghue, 1924 (Cape Columbine to Algoa Bay)

Order Cyclostomatida
Family Diaperoeciidae
Beauteous bryozoan, pore-tubed bryozoan, Nevianipora pulcherrima (Kirkpatrick, 1890) syn. Tubulipora pulcherrima (Cape Peninsula to Mossel Bay, Indo-Pacific)

Molluscs

Gastropoda – slugs and snails

Patellogastropoda – true limpets

Family Patellidae – true limpets
Helcion dunkeri Krauss, 1848 (Namibia to KwaZulu-Natal) 
Prickly limpet, Helcion pectunculus (Gmelin, 1791) (Namibia to central KwaZulu-Natal) 
Rayed limpet, Helcion pruinosus Krauss, 1848 (Cape Columbine to central KwaZulu-Natal)
Argenville's limpet, Scutellastra argenvillei Krauss, 1848 (Namibia to KwaZulu-Natal south coast) (syn. Patella argenvillei)
Bearded limpet, Scutellastra barbara Linnaeus, 1758 (Orange River to central KwaZulu-Natal) (syn, Patella barbara) 
Pear limpet, Scutellastra cochlear Born, 1778 (Orange River to KwaZulu-Natal south coast) (syn. Patella cochlear)
Kelp limpet, Patella compressa Linnaeus. 1758 (Namibia to Cape Point) (syn. Cymbula compressa)
Granite limpet, Patella granatina Linnaeus, 1758 (Namibia to Cape Agulhas) (syn. Cymbula granatina)
Granular limpet, Scutellastra granularis Linnaeus, 1758 (Namibia to KwaZulu-Natal north coast) (syn. Patella granularis)
Duck's foot or Long-spined limpet, Scutellastra longicosta Lamarck, 1819 (Cape Point to central KwaZulu-Natal) (syn. Patella longicosta)
Pink rayed limpet, Patella miniata Born, 1778 (Namibia to Eastern Cape) (syn. Cymbula miniata)
Goat's eye limpet, Patella oculus Born, 1778 (Cape Columbine to KwaZulu-Natal south coast) (syn. Cymbula oculus)
Giant limpet, Scutellastra tabularis Krauss, 1848 (Cape Point to KwaZulu-Natal south coast) (syn. Patella tabularis)

Vetigastropoda

Family Haliotidae – abalone
Perlemoen or abalone, Haliotis midae Linnaeus, 1758 (Cape Columbine to KwaZulu-Natal South coast)
Spiral-ridged siffie, Haliotis parva Linnaeus, 1758 (Cape Point to Eastern Cape)
Siffie or Venus ear, Haliotis spadicea Donovan, E., 1808 (Cape Point to KwaZulu-Natal north coast)

Family Fissurellidae – keyhole limpets
Saddle-shaped keyhole limpet, Amblychilepas scutella (Gmelin, 1791) (Namibia to northern KwaZulu-Natal) (syn. Dendrofissurella scutellum (Gmelin, 1791))
Conical keyhole limpet, Diodora parviforata (G.B. Sowerby III, 1889) (Orange River to Eastern Cape) (syn. Fissurella parviforata G.B. Sowerby III, 1889)
Diodora elevata (Dunker, 1846) (Saldanha Bay to western Transkei)
Cape keyhole limpet, Fissurella mutabilis Sowerby, 1834 (Orange River to Eastern Cape)
Mantled keyhole limpet, Pupillaea aperta (G.B. Sowerby I, 1825) (Orange River to KwaZulu-Natal south coast) (syn. Fissurellidea aperta G.B. Sowerby, 1825)

Caenogastropoda

Family Janthinidae
Bubble raft shell or violet snail, Janthina janthina Linnaeus, 1758 (Cape Columbine to Mozambique)

Family Turritellidae
Waxy screw shell, Turritella capensis (Krauss, 1848)(Namibia to Eastern Cape) (syn. Protoma (Protomella) capensis)
Turritella carinifera Lamarck, 1799 (Western Cape to southern Mozambique)
Pale screw shell, Turritella sanguinea Reeve, 1849 (Cape Point to Natal)

Littorinimorpha

Family Aporrhaidae – pelican foot shells
Aporrhais pesgallinae Barnard, 1963 (Namibia and Western Cape)

Family Assimineidae
Globular mud snail, Assiminea globulus Connoly, 1939 (Cape Columbine to Eastern Cape)

Family Calyptraeidae – slipper limpets
Crepidula aculeata (Gmelin, 1791) (Namibia to KwaZulu-Natal)
Crepidula dilatata Lamarck, 1822 (Lambert's Bay to Mossel Bay)
Slipper limpet, Crepidula porcellana (Linnaeus, 1758) (Namibia to KwaZulu-Natal north coast)
Chinese hat Calyptraea chinensis (Linnaeus, 1758) (Namibia to Transkei)

Family Cassidae – helmet shells
Helmet shell, Semicassis labiata zeylanica (Lamarck, 1822) (Cape Point to northern KwaZulu-Natal) (syn. Phalium labiatum zeylanicum)

Family Cypraeidae – true cowries
Dark toothed cowrie, Cypraea fuscodentata Gray, 1825 (Cape Point to Tsitsikamma) (syn. Cypraeovula fuscodentata)
Cypraea fuscorubra Shaw, 1909 (Namaqualand to Cape Agulhas) (syn. Cypraeovula fuscorubra)
Cypraeovula iutsui Shikama, 1974 syn. Cypraea iutsui (as Cypraea iutsui Olifants River Mouth (West Coast) to Port Alfred))
Cypraeovula castanea (Higgins, 1868) (False Bay to East London)

Family Hipponicidae – hoof limpets
Horse's hoof, Hipponix conicus (Schumacher, 1817) (Cape Point to Mozambique)

Family Littorinidae
African periwinkle, Nodilittorina africana (Philippi, 1847) (Namibia to northern KwaZulu-Natal)

Family Naticidae – necklace shells
Mottled necklace shell, Natica tecta Anton, 1839 (Namibia to Eastern Cape)

Family Ranellidae
Pustular triton, Argobuccinum pustulosum Lightfoot, 1786 (Orange River to Eastern Cape)
Pink lady, Charonia lampas Linnaeus, 1758 (as Charonia lampas pustulata Cape Point to Mozambique)
Ranella gemmifera Euthyme, 1889 (as Ranella australasia gemmifera Cape Point to Durban)
Furry ridged triton, Cabestana africana Adams A. 1855 (as Cabestana cutacea africana Namibia to southern Mozambique)

Family Triviidae – trivia
Triviella magnidentata (Liltved, 1986) syn. Trivia magnidentata (Cape Town to East London)
West coast baby's toes, Triviella millardi (Cate, 1979) (as Trivia millardi Cape west coast)(Cape Agulhas and north)
Triviella neglecta Schilder, 1930 (Cape Peninsula, Cape Agulhas and north (?))syn. Trivia neglecta
Baby's toes, Trivia ovulata (Cape Point to south Transkei)
Triviella sanctispiritus (Shikama, 1974) (Cape Town to East London) syn. Trivia sanctispiritus

Family Velutinidae
?Lamellaria (s.l.) capensis Bergh, 1907 (Cape Point and north (?))
?Lamellaria (s.l.) leptoconcha Bergh, 1907 (Cape Point and north (?))
Lamellaria perspicua Linnaeus, 1758 (Cape Point and north (?))

Family Vermetidae – worm shells
Colonial worm shell, Dendropoma corallinaceus (Tomlin, 1939) (Orange river to Transkei) (Keen & Morton listed as authors by WoRMS) (syn. Vermetus (Stoa) corallinaceus Tomlin, 1939) 
Solitary worm shell, Serpulorbis natalensis Mörch, 1862 (Namaqualand to central Kwa-Zulu-Natal)

Neogastropoda

Family Babyloniidae
Spotted  Zemiropsis papillaris (G.B. Sowerby I, 1825), (False Bay to eastern Transkei)

Family Buccinidae
Flame-patterned burnupena, Burnupena catarrhacta Gmelin, 1791 (Orange river to Agulhas)
Ridged burnupena, Burnupena cincta Röding, 1798 (Namibia to Transkei)
Burnupena lagenaria Lamarck, 1822 (Saldanha to Zululand)
Papery burnupena, Burnupena papyracea Bruguière, 1792 (Orange river to Agulhas)
Burnupena pubescens Küster, 1858 (North western Cape to Durban)

Family Conidae – cone shells
Algoa cone, Conus algoensis G. B. Sowerby II, 1834 (Cape Columbine to Cape Agulhas)
Conus algoensis algoensis (West Coast)
Yellow Algoa cone, Conus algoensis simplex G. B. Sowerby II, 1858 (Cape Point to Hermanus)
Elongate cone, Conus mozambicus Hwass in Bruguière, 1792 (Orange river to Eastern Cape)

Family Fasciolariidae
Lugubrilaria lugubris (A. Adams & Reeve, 1847) (Saldanha to False Bay) (syn? Pleuroploca lugubris lugubris (Adams, A. & L.A. Reeve in Reeve, L.A., 1847)), Fasciolaria lugubris lugubris
Long-siphoned whelk, Fusinus ocelliferus Lamarck, 1816 (Namaqualand to central KwaZulu-Natal)

Family Marginellidae – marginellas
Marginella musica Hinds, 1844 (Luderitz to Cape Agulhas)
Cloudy marginella, Marginella nebulosa Bolten in Röding, P.F., 1798 (Cape Point to Eastern Cape)
Sandy marginella, Marginella piperata Hinds, 1844 (Cape Point to KwaZulu-Natal north coast)
Pinch lipped marginella, Marginella rosea Lamarck, 1822 (Cape Columbine to Cape Agulhas)
Cape marginella, Volvarina capensis Krauss, 1848 (Namibia to Cape Hangklip)
Banded volvarina or banded marginella, Volvarina zonata (Kiener, 1841) (Saldanha Bay to Port Elizabeth)

Family Mitridae – mitres
Brown mitre, Mitra picta Reeve, 1844 (Cape Columbine to KwaZulu-Natal south coast)

Family Muricidae
Fenestrate oyster drill, Ocenebra fenestrata Gould, 1833 (Cape Point to Transkei)
Stag shell Pteropurpura (Poropteron) graagae (Coen, 1947) (Eastern Cape to northern KwaZulu-Natal)
Pteropurpurea (Poropteron) uncinaria Lamarck, 1822 (Namibia to Port Alfred)
Thais wahlbergi (Saldanha to False Bay)
Girdled dogwhelk, Nucella cingulata Linnaeus, 1771 (Orange river to Cape Point)
Common dogwhelk, Nucella dubia (Krauss, 1848) (Namibia to Transkei)
Scaly dogwhelk, Nucella squamosa (Lamarck, 1816) (Namibia to Transkei)

Family Nassariidae

Dogwhelks

Cape dogwhelk, Nassarius capensis R. W. Dunker, 1846 (Cape Columbine to Transkei)
Tick shell, Nassarius kraussianus (Dunker, R.W., 1846) (Namaqualand to Mozambique)
Purple-lipped dogwhelk, Nassarius speciosus (Adams, A., 1852) (Orange river to Transkei)

Plough shells
Annulated plough shell, Bullia annulata Lamarck, 1816 (Cape Columbine to Mozambique)
Finger plough shell, Bullia digitalis (Dillwyn, L.W., 1817) (Namibia to Transkei)
Fat plough shell, Bullia laevissima (Gmelin, 1791) (Namibia to Transkei)
Pure plough shell, Bullia pura Melvill, J.C., 1885 (Cape Point to central KwaZulu-Natal)
Smooth plough shell, Bullia rhodostoma Reeve, L.A., 1847 (Cape Point to North KwaZulu-Natal)

Family Turridae
Ribbed turrid, Clionella sinuata Born, 1778 (Namibia to Eastern Cape)
Clionella rosaria (Cape Point to KwaZulu-Natal)

Heterobranchia

clade Cephalaspidea – head shield slugs
Family Cylichnidae
 Cylichna tubulosa Gould, 1859 (Angola to Durban)

Family Retusidae
 Retusa truncatula (Bruguiere, 1792) (False Bay to Durban, also northern Europe, Mediterranean, Canary Islands)

Family Philinidae
 Sand slug, Philine aperta (Linnaeus, 1767) (eastern Atlantic Ocean, Northern Europe to southern Africa, also Pacific and Indian Oceans)

Family Aglajidae
 Slipper slug, Philinopsis capensis (Bergh, 1907) (False Bay to East London)

Family Gastropteridae
 Gastropteron alboaurantium Gosliner, 1984 (Atlantic coast Cape Peninsula)
 Gastropteron flavobrunneum Gosliner, 1984 (Atlantic coast Cape Peninsula)

Family Haminoeidae
 Green bubble shell, Haminoea alfredensis Bartsch, 1915 (Cape Peninsula to north of East London)

Family Bullidae
 Mottled bubble shell, Bulla ampulla Linnaeus, 1758 (whole South African coast, Indo-Pacific)

clade Aplysiomorpha – sea hares
Family Aplysiidae
 Variable sea hare, Aplysia juliana Quoy & Gaimard, 1832 (Blougbergstrand to Mozambique)
 Spotted sea hare, Aplysia oculifera Adams & Reeve, 1850 (Cape Peninsula to KwaZulu-Natal north coast, Indo-Pacific)
 Dwarf sea hare, Aplysia parvula Morch, 1863 (Cape Peninsula to northern KwaZulu-Natal, circumtropical)
 Shaggy sea hare, Bursatella leachii (Blainville, 1817) (Saldanha Bay to Mozambique, Indo-Pacific)

clade Sacoglossa – sap-sucking slugs
Family Oxynoidae
 Oxynoe sp. (False Bay and Knynsa Lagoon)

Family Placobranchidae
 Plant-sucking nudibranch, Elysia spp. (Orange River to northern KwaZulu-Natal)

Family Stiligeridae
 Dendritic nudibranch, Placida dendritica (Alder & Hancock, 1843) (Elands Bay to Port Alfred, cosmopolitan)

Family Hermaeidae
 Table Bay nudibranch, Aplysiopsis sinusmensalis (Macnae, 1954) (both sides of the Cape Peninsula)

clade Pleurobranchomorpha – sidegill slugs
Family Pleurobranchidae
 Mosaic pleurobranch, Pleurobranchus albiguttatus (Bergh, 1905) (False Bay to Algoa Bay)
 Berthella plumula (Montagu, 1803) (Atlantic Coast of the Cape Peninsula at Kommetjie and McClear's Beach, Knysna, northern Europe and Mediterranean)
 Berthella sp. (Bakoven, Atlantic Coast Cape Peninsula)
 Lemon pleurobranch, Berthellina granulata (Krauss, 1848) (Cape Peninsula at Kommetjie to Mozambique, Indo-Pacific)
 Warty pleurobranch, Pleurobranchaea bubala Marcus and Gosliner, 1984 (Cape Peninsula to Jeffreys Bay)
 Dwarf warty pleurobranch, Pleurobranchaea tarda Verrill, 1880 (Atlantic Coast Cape Peninsula to Knysna)

clade Nudibranchia – nudibranchs
subclade Doridacea – dorid nudibranchs
Family Dorididae
 Warty dorid, Doris granosa (Bergh, 1907) (Luderitz in Namibia to Port Elizabeth, also Indian and Atlantic Oceans)
 Rugby-ball dorid, Atagema rugosa Pruvot-Fol, 1951 (atlantioc Coast, Cape Peninsula, Mediterranean)
 Velvet dorid, Jorunna tomentosa (Cuvier, 1804) (Elands Bay to Knysna, also Europe)
 Three-spot dorid, Aldisa trimaculata Gosliner in Millen & Gosliner, 1985 (Atlantic coast Cape Peninsula and Gordon's Bay)
 Aldisa benguelae Gosliner in Millen & Gosliner, 1985 (Atlantic coast Cape Peninsula)

Family Discodorididae
 Small-spot dorid, Discodoris sp. 1 (both sides of the Cape Peninsula)
 Blotchy dorid, Geitodoris capensis Bergh, 1907 (Atlantic coast, Cape Peninsula and Port Alfred)
 Variable dorid, Aphelodoris brunnea Bergh, 1907 (False Bay to East London)
 Chocolate-chip nudibranch, Aphelodoris sp. 1 (both sides of the Cape Peninsula)
 Brown-spotted nudibranch, Aphelodoris sp. 2 (Atlantic coast Cape Peninsula)
 Spiky nudibranch, Aphelodoris sp. 3 (Atlantic coast Cape Peninsula)
 Ocellate dorid, Gargamella sp. 1 (western False Bay)
 Gargamella sp. 2 (western False Bay)
 Red sponge nudibranch, Rostanga elandsia Garovoy, Valdes & Gosliner, 2001 (Atlantic coast Cape Peninsula to Rooi Els)
 Rostanga phepha Garovoy, Valdés & Gosliner, 2001 (Atlantic coast Cape Peninsula)

Family Chromodorididae
 Red-spotted nudibranch, Goniobranchus heatherae Gosliner, 1994 syn. Chromodoris heatherea (Atlantic coast Cape Peninsula to Port Elizabeth)
 Protea dorid, Noumea protea Gosliner, 1994 (Atlantic coast Cape Peninsula and Gordon's Bay)
 Cape dorid, Hypselodoris capensis (Barnard, 1927) (Cape Point to the Wild Coast)
 Inkspot nudibranch, Ceratosoma ingozi Gosliner, 1996 (False Bay)
 Saddled nudibranch, Cadlina sp. 1 (False Bay)
 Brown-dotted nudibranch, Cadlina sp. 2 (both sides of the Cape Peninsula)

Family Dendrodorididae
 Blue-speckled nudibranch, Dendrodoris caesia (Bergh, 1907) (Cape Point to Port Elizabeth)
 Tan dorid Doriopsilla capensis (Bergh, 1907) (Atlantic coast Cape Peninsula)
 Scribbled nudibranch, Doriopsilla miniata (Alder and Hancock, 1864) (Atlantic coast Cape Peninsula to Sodwana Bay, also Mediterranean, India, Australia and Japan)

Family Mandeliidae
 Mandela's nudibranch, Mandelia mirocornata Valdés & Gosliner, 1999 (Cape Peninsula, False Bay and Algoa Bay)

Family Onchidorididae
 Fluffy nudibranch, Acanthodoris planca Fahey & Valdes, 2005 9both sides Cape Peninsula)

Family Goniodorididae
 Fiery nudibranch, Okenia amoenula (Bergh, 1907) (Atlantic coast Cape Peninsula to Port Elizabeth)
 Goniodoris castanea Alder & Hancock, 1845 syn. G. brunnea (Cape Peninsula to Port Alfred, also Europe, Mediterranean, Japan and New Zealand)
 Tugboat nudibranch, Goniodoris mercurialis Macnae, 1958 (both sides of the Cape Peninsula)
 White-lined nudibranch, Trapania sp. 1 (Atlantic coast Cape Peninsula to Knysna)
 Giraffe spot nudibranch, Ancula sp. (Cape Peninsula and False Bay)

Family Corambidae
 Crazed nudibranch, Corambe sp. (False Bay)

Family Polyceridae
 Feather nudibranch, Thecacera pennigera (Montagu, 1815) (Cape Peninsula to KwaZulu-Natal, cosmopolitan)
 Crowned nudibranch, Polycera capensis Quoy & Gaimard, 1824 (Luderitz, Namibia to Port Alfred, also Sydney Harbour)
 Four lined nudibranch, Polycera quadrilineata (Muller, 1776) (False Bay, Knysna Lagoon and Algoa Bay)
 Twin-crowned nudibranch, Polycera sp. 1 (False Bay)
 Tasselled nudibranch, Kaloplocamus ramosus (Cantraine, 1835) (Cape Peninsula to Wild Coast)
 Orange-clubbed nudibranch, Limacia clavigera (Muller, 1776) (Saldanha Bay to Port Alfred)
 Black nudibranch, Tambja capensis (Bergh, 1907) (Atlantic coast Cape Peninsula to Port Elizabeth)

Family Aegiretidae
 Knobbly nudibranch, Aegires ninguis Fahey & Gosliner, 2004 (Atlantic coast Cape Peninsula to Port Elizabeth)

Family Gymnodorididae
 Ghost nudibranch, Lecithophorus capensis Macnae, 1958 (both sides of the Cape Peninsula)

subclade Dendronotida
Family Scyllaeidae
 Iridescent nudibranch, Notobryon sp. (Elands Bay to Jeffreys Bay)

Family Tethydidae
 Dinosaur nudibranch, Melibe liltvedi Gosliner, 1987 (Atlantic coast Cape Peninsula)
 Cowled nudibranch, Melibe rosea Rang, 1829 (Port Nolloth to Port Alfred)

Family Dotidae
 Crowned doto, Doto coronata (Gmelin, 1791) (Atlantic coast Cape Peninsula to Knysna, also North Atlantic and Mediterranean)
 Feathered doto, Doto pinnatifida (Montagu, 1804) (Atlantic coast Cape Peninsula to Knysna, also English Channel)
 Doto rosea Trinchese, 1881 (False Bay)

Family Tritoniidae
 Whip-fan nudibranch, Tritonia nilsodhneri Marcus, 1983 (Atlantic coast Cape Peninsula, also Atlantic coasts of Britain, Ireland and France)
 Soft coral nudibranch, Tritonia sp. 1 (False Bay to Port Elizabeth)
 Brush nudibranch, Tritonia sp. 2 (both sides Cape Peninsula, Gordons Bay and Jeffreys Bay)

subclade Euarminida
Family Arminidae
 Gilchrist's armina, Armina gilchristi (Bergh, 1907) (Cape Point to Jeffreys Bay)
 Pierre's armina, Armina sp. (False Bay)
 White-ridged nudibranch, Dermatobranchus sp. 1 (Atlantic coast Cape Peninsula and Port Elizabeth)
 Brown ridged nudibranch, Dermatobranchus sp. 4 (both sides Cape Peninsula)

subclade Cladobranchia

Family Lemindidae
 Frilled nudibranch, Leminda millecra Griffiths, 1985 (Cape Peninsula to KwaZulu-Natal)

Family Proctonotidae
 Cape silvertip nudibranch, Janolus capensis Bergh, 1907 (Saldanha Bay to East London)
 Medallion silvertip nudibranch, Janolus longidentatus Gosliner, 1981 (False Bay)
 Nippled nudibranch, Janolus sp. (South Paw, off Clifton, Cape Peninsula)
 Gasflame nudibranch, Bonisa nakaza Gosliner, 1981 (Atlantic coast Cape Peninsula to Port Elizabeth)

subclade Aeolidida – aeolid nudibranchs
Family Flabellinidae
White-edged nudibranch, Flabellina capensis (Thiele, 1925) (Atlantic coast Cape Peninsula to Port Elizabeth)
 Purple lady nudibranch, Flabellina funeka Gosliner and Griffiths, 1981 (Cape Point to Port Elizabeth)
 Flabellina sp. 1 (both sides Cape Peninsula)
 Flabellina sp. 2 (western False Bay: Windmill and Dassie Point)

Family Eubranchidae
 Eubranchus sp. 1 (both sides Cape Peninsula)
 Eubranchus sp. 2 (False Bay to Knysna)
 Fireworks nudibranch, Eubranchus sp. 4 (near Vulcan rock, south of Hout Bay)
 Candelabra nudibranch, Eubranchus sp. 5 (False Bay)

Family Embletoniidae
 Embletonia gracilis Risbec, 1928 (western False Bay, also Japan, New Caledonia, Australia and Hawaii)

Family Tergipedidae 
 Candy nudibranch, Cuthona speciosa (Macnae, 1954) (Atlantic coast Cape Peninsula to Port Elizabeth)
 Cuthona sp. 1 (both sides Cape Peninsula)
 Cuthona sp. 2 (both sides Cape Peninsula)
 Tergipes tergipes Forskal, 1779 (both sides Cape Peninsula, widespread in the Atlantic Ocean)
 Catriona casha Gosliner & Griffiths, 1981 (Langebaan Lagoon to Knysna)
 Catriona columbiana (O'Donoghue, 1922) (Cape Town Harbour, Pacific coast of North America and Japan)

Family Facelinidae
 Olive nudibranch, Facelina olivacea Macnae, 1954 (Saldanha Bay to Cape Town Harbour, Knysna and Jeffreys Bay)
 Black-dot nudibranch, Caloria sp. 1 (both sides Cape Peninsula)
 Yellow-tipped nudibranch, Caloria sp. 2 (both sides Cape Peninsula)
 Coral nudibranch, Phyllodesmium horridum (Macnae, 1954) (False Bay to Sodwana Bay, also Japan and Australia)
Night sky nudibranch, Amanda armata Macnae, 1954 (both sides Cape Peninsula and False Bay)
 Orange-eyed nudibranch, Cratena capensis Barnard, 1927 (Saldanha Bay to Port Alfred)
 Elegant nudibranch, Cratena sp. 1 (False Bay to Plettenberg Bay)

Family Glaucidae
 Four-colour nudibranch, Godiva quadricolor (Barnard, 1927) (Bloubergstrand to East London, also Ghana)

Family Aeolidiidae
 Indica nudibranch, Anteaeolidiella foulisi (Bergh, 1888) syn. Anteaeolidiella indica, Aolidiella indica (Saldanha Bay to southern KwaZulu-Natal, circumtropical)
 Sea swallow, Glaucus atlanticus Forster, 1777 (False Bay to KwaZulu-Natal, circumtropical)

Bivalvia

Order Mytilida
Family Mytilidae
Ribbed mussel, Aulacomya ater (Molina, 1782) (Namibia to Eastern Cape)
Black mussel, Choromytilus meridionalis (Krauss, 1848) (Namibia to Tsitsikamma)
Half-hairy mussel, Gregariella petagnae (Scacchi, 1832) (Namibia to central KwaZulu-Natal)
Mediterranean mussel, Mytilus galloprovincialis Lamarck, 1819 (Orange River to Eastern Cape)
Brown mussel, Perna perna (Linne, 1758) (Cape Point to Mozambique)

Order Arcida
Family Arcidae – ark clams
Oblique ark shell, Barbatia obliquata (Gray, 1837) (Cape Columbine to Mozambique)

Order Pteriida
Family Pinnidae – pen shells 
Horse mussel, Atrina squamifera (Sowerby, 1835) (Cape Columbine to Eastern Cape)

Order Ostreida
Family Ostreidae – true oysters
Ostrea atherstonei Newton, 1913 (Saldanha Bay to KwaZulu-Natal south coast)
Cape rock oyster, Crassostrea margaritacea (Lamarck, 1819) (Cape Point to Mozambique)

Order Pectinida
Family Pectinidae – scallops
Dwarf fan shell, Chlamys tincta (Reeve, 1853) (Cape Columbine to Mozambique)
South African scallop, Pecten sulcicostatus Sowerby II, 1842 (Cape Point to Eastern Cape)

Order Limida
Family Limidae – file shells
File shell, Limaria tuberculata (Olivi, 1792) (Cape Columbine to KwaZulu-Natal south coast)

Order Venerida
Family Mactridae – trough shells
Otter shell, Lutraria lutraria (Linne, 1758) (Namibia to Eastern Cape)
Smooth trough shell, Mactra glabrata Linne, 1767 (Cape Columbine to Mozambique)
Angular surf clam, Scissodesma spengleri (Linne, 1767) (Cape Point to Eastern Cape)

Order Carditida
Family Carditidae
Dead man's hands, Thecalia concamerata (Gmelin, 1791) (Port Nolloth to Transkei)

Order unassigned, Euheterodonta
Family Solenidae
Pencil bait, Solen capensis P. Fischer, 1881 (Namaqualand to Eastern Cape)

Order Venerida
Family Lasaeidae
Dwarf rusty clam, Lasaea adansoni turtoni Bartsch, 1915 (Cape Point to Mozambique)Gmelin 1791

Tellinidae
Ridged tellin, Gastrana matadoa (Gmelin, 1791) (Cape Point to northern KwaZulu-Natal)
Port Alfred tellin, Tellina alfredensisBartsch, 1915 Linnaeus 1758 (Cape Point to KwaZulu-Natal south coast)
Gilchrist's tellin, Tellina gilchristi Sowerby, 1904 (Cape Columbine to Eastern Cape)
Tellina trilatera Gmelin, 1791 (Orange river to Transkei)

family Veneridae – Venus shells
Heart clam, Dosinia lupinus orbignyi Dunker, 1845 (Namibia to Eastern Cape)
Zigzag clam, Pitar abbreviatus Krauss, 1848 (Cape Point to Mozambique)
Mottled venus, Sunetta contempta bruggeni Fischer & Piette, 1974 (Cape Point to northern KwaZulu-Natal)
Streaked sand clam, Tivela compressa (Sowerby, 1851) (Cape Point to Eastern Cape)
Corrugated venus, Venerupis corrugatus (Gmelin, 1791) (Namibia to central KwaZulu-Natal) accepted as Venerupis senegalensis
Warty venus, Venus verrucosa Linnaeus, 1758 (Namibia to Mozambique)

Polyplacophora – chitons

Order Chitonida
Family Ischnochitonidae
Textile chiton, Ischnochiton textilis (Gray, 1828) (Namibia to central KwaZulu-Natal)
Dwarf chiton, Ischnochiton oniscus (Krauss, 1848) (Cape Columbine to Mozambique)
Ribbed scale chiton, Ischnochiton bergoti (Velain, 1877) (Namibia to Cape Point)

Family Chitonidae
Tulip chiton, Chiton tulipa (Quoy & Gaimard, 1835) (Cape Columbine to KwaZulu-Natal south coast)
Brooding chiton, Chiton nigrovirescens de Blainville, 1825 (Namibia to Cape Agulhas) (accepted as Radsia nigrovirescens)
Black chiton, Onithochiton literatus (Krauss, 1848) (Cape Point to Mozambique)

Family Callochitonidae
Broad chiton, Callochiton castaneus (Wood, 1815) (Orange river to northern KwaZulu-Natal)

Family Acanthochitonidae
Spiny chiton, Acanthochitona garnoti de Blainville, 1825 (Cape Columbine to KwaZulu-Natal south coast)

Family Chaetopleuridae
Giant chiton or armadillo, Dinoplax gigas Gmelin, 1791 (Cape Point to KwaZulu-Natal south coast)
Hairy chiton, Chaetopleura papilio Spengler, 1797 (Namibia to Cape Point)
Orange hairy chiton, Chaetopleura pertusa Reeve, 1847 (Cape Columbine to northern KwaZulu-Natal)

Cephalopoda

Order Octopoda – octopus
Family Octopodidae
Common octopus, Octopus vulgaris Cuvier, 1797 (Namibia to northern KwaZulu-Natal)
Brush-tipped octopus, Eledone schultzei Hoyle, 1910 (Cape Columbine to Cape Point) (syn. Eledone thysanophora, Aphrodoctopus schultzei)

Family Argonautidae
Paper nautilus, Argonauta argo Linnaeus, 1758 (Cape Point to northern KwaZulu-Natal)

Order Teuthida – squid
Family Loliginidae
Chokka or calimari, Loligo vulgaris reynaudi (Orbigny, 1845) (Orange River to Eastern Cape) (syn. Loligo reynaudi Orbigny, 1845)

Order Sepiolida – bobtail squid
Unidentified species (Cape Peninsula, both sides)

Order Sepiida – vuttlefish
Beautiful cuttlefish, Sepia (Hemisepius) pulchra Roeleveld & Liltved, 1985
Tuberculate cuttlefish, Sepia tuberculata Lamarck, 1798 (Cape Columbine to Eastern Cape)
Common cuttlefish Sepia vermiculata Quoy and Gaimard, 1832 (Orange River to Mozambique)

Brachiopoda – lampshells

Order Terebratulida
Family Kraussinidae
Kraussina crassicostata Jackson, 1952 (Cape Point to Mossel Bay)
Ruby lamp shell, Kraussina rubra (Pallas, 1766) (Luderitz to southern KwaZulu-Natal)

Family Cancellothyrididae
Terebratulina meridionalis (Adams & Reeve) (Cape Peninsula)

Echinoderms

Crinoidea – feather stars

Order Comatulida
Family Comatulidae
Common feather star, Comanthus wahlbergii (Muller, 1843) (False Bay to Mozambique)

Family Tropiometridae
Elegant feather star, Tropiometra carinata (Lamarck, 1816) (Cape Point to Mozambique)

Asteroidea – starfish

Order Paxillosida
Family Astropectinidae
Sand starfish, Astropecten irregularis pontoporeus Sladen, 1883 (Namibia to Port Elizabeth)

Order Valvatida
Family Goniasteridae
Cobbled starfish, Calliaster baccatus Sladen, 1889 (Lamberts Bay to Port Elizabeth)

Family Ophidiasteridae
Granular starfish, Austrofromia schultzei (Doderlein, 1910) (False Bay to Port Elizabeth)

Family Asterinidae
Red starfish, Callopatiria granifera (Gray, 1847) (Namibia to Durban) (syn. Patiria granifera)

Order Forcipulatida
Family Asteriidae
Spiny starfish, Marthasterias glacialis (Linnaeus, 1758) (Saldanha Bay to Port Elizabeth)
Many-armed starfish Coscinasterias calamaria (Gray, 1840) (Saldanha Bay to False Bay)

Order Spinulosida
Family Asterinidae
Subtidal cushion star, Patiriella dyscrita (H.L. Clark, 1923) (Cape Point to Port Elizabeth)
Dwarf cushion star, Parvulastra exigua (Lamarck, 1816) (Namibia to Mozambique) syn. Patiriella exigua

Order Velatida
Family Pterasteridae
Brooding cushion star, Pteraster capensis Gray, 1847 (Luderitz to Durban)

Order Spinulosida
Family Echinasteridae
Reticulated starfish, Henricia ornata (Perrier, 1869) (Luderitz to Durban)

Ophiuroidea – brittlestars

Order Euryalida
Family Gorgonocephalidae
Basket star, gorgon's head brittle star, Astrocladus euryale (Retzius, 1783) (Cape Peninsula to Port Elizabeth)

Order Ophiurida
Family Ophiotrichidae
Hairy brittle star, Ophiothrix fragilis (Abildgaard, 1789) (Luderitz to Durban)

Family Amphiuridae
Equal-tailed brittle star, Amphiura capensis Ljungman 1867 (whole coast)

Family Ophionereididae
Striped brittle star, Ophionereis dubia (Muller & Troschel, 1842) (False Bay to Mozambique)

Family Ophiodermatidae
Banded brittle star, Ophiarachnella capensis (Bell, 1888) (Saldanha Bay to Durban)
Serpent-skinned brittle star Ophioderma wahlbergii Muller & Troschel, 1842 (Luderitz to Durban)

Echinoidea – sea urchins

Order Echinoida
Family Echinidae
Deepwater urchin, Echinus gilchristi Bell, 1904 (Luderitz to Port Elizabeth)
Cape urchin, Parechinus angulosus Leske, 1778 (Luderitz to Durban)

Order Cassiduloida
Family Echinolampadidae
Lamp urchin, Echinolampas crassa (Bell, 1880) (False Bay to Port Elizabeth)

Order Spatangoida
Family Brissidae 
Smooth-shelled urchin, Spatagobrissus mirabilis H.L. Clark, 1923 (False Bay)

Family Loveniidae
Heart urchin, Echinocardium cordatum (Pennant, 1777) (Lamberts Bay to Mozambique)

Holothuroidea – sea cucumbers

Order Dendrochirotida
Family Cucumariidae 
Mauve sea cucumber, Pentacta doliolum (Pallas, 1766) (West African coast to Port Elizabeth)
Horseshoe sea cucumber, Roweia frauenfeldi (Ludwig, 1882) (Angola to East London)
Stephenson's sea cucumber, Roweia stephensoni (John, 1939) (False Bay to Wild Coast)
Red-chested sea cucumber, Pseudocnella insolens (Theel, 1886) (Port Nolloth to Durban)

Family Phyllophoridae
Golden sea cucumber, Thyone aurea (Quoy & Gaimard, 1834) (Luderitz to False Bay)

Tunicates

Order Aplousobranchia

Family Clavelinidae
 Bell ascidian, Clavelina lepadiformis (Muller, 1776) (False Bay to Port Elizabeth)
 Choirboys, Clavelina sp. syn Podoclavella sp. (Western Cape)
 Foam ascidian, Polycitor porrecta (Millar, 1962) (Atlantic coast Cape Peninsula)
 Sago pudding ascidian, Cystodytes dellechiajei (Della Valle, 1877) (False Bay to Sodwana Bay, also Atlantic Ocean and Mediterranean)
 Snowball ascidian, Distaplia skoogi Michaelsen, 1934 (False Bay and Ibo Island Mozambique)
 Fan ascidian, Sycozoa arborescens Hartmeyer, 1912 (Namibian border to Port Elizabeth)

Family Didemnidae
 Lattice ascidian, Didemnum spp. (False Bay to Sodwana Bay)
 Brain ascidian, Trididemnum cerebriforme Hartmeyer, 1913 (Cape Columbine to Durban)
 Gossamer ascidian, Diplosoma listerianum (Milne-Edwards, 1841) (Cape Columbine to Mozambique)

Family Holozoidae
 Lobed ascidian, bulb ascidian, Sigillina digitata (Millar, 1962) (Western Cape)

Family Polyclinidae
 Mushroom ascidian, Aplidium circulatum (Hartmeyer, 1912) (False Bay to Jeffreys Bay)
 Aplidium crustatum F. Monniot, 2001 (Saldanha Bay to False Bay)
 Rosette sea squirt Aplidium flavolineatum (Sluiter, 1898a) (Saldanha Bay to Sodwana Bay)

Order Phlebobranchia

Family Ascidiidae
 Red-spotted ascidian, Ascidia incrassata Heller, 1878 (Saldanha Bay to Mozambique)
 Crevice ascidian, Ascidia caudata Heller, 1878 (Cape Peninsula)

Family Cionidae
 Transparent ascidian, sea vase, Ciona intestinalis (Linnaeus, 1767) (whole coast, cosmopolitan)

Order Stolidobranchia

Family Pyuridae
 Red bait, Pyura stolonifera (Heller, 1878) (Namibia to Durban)
 Herdman's redbait, Pyura herdmani (Drasche, 1884) (Walvis Bay to Durban)

Family Styelidae
 Ladder ascidian, Botrylloides leachi (Savigny, 1816) (West coast of Africa to southern KwaZulu-Natal)
 White-ringed ascidian, Botrylloides magnicoecum (Hartmeyer, 1912) (Orange River to Durban) syn. Botryllus magnicoecus
 Fenced ascidian, Botryllus closionis Monniot, Monniot, Griffiths & Schleyer, 2001 (Atlantic coast Cape Peninsula)
 Seaweed ascidian, Botryllus elegans (Quoy & Gaimard, 1834) (Luderitz to Cape Agulhas)
 Variable ascidian, Botryllus gregalis (Sluiter, 1898) (Cape Columbine to Durban)
 Golden star ascidian, Botryllus schlosseri (Pallas, 1766) (Cape Columbine to Port St Johns (alien))
 Meandering ascidian, Botryllus maeandrius (Sluiter, 1898) (Cape Peninsula to Mossel Bay)
 Angular ascidian, Styela angularis (Stimpson, 1855) (Atlantic coast of Cape Peninsula to Port Elizabeth)
 , Gynandrocarpa placenta (Herdman, 1886) (Cape Peninsula to Algoa Bay)

Vertebrates

Fishes

Agnatha – jawless fishes (cyclostomes)

Order Myxiniformes – hagfishes
Family: Myxinidae 
Sixgill hagfish or snotslang, Eptatretus hexatrema (Müller, 1834) (Walvis Bay to Durban)
Fivegill hagfish, Eptatretus profundus Barnard, 1923 (off Cape Point)
Cape hagfish, Myxine capensis Regan, 1913 (Cape of Good Hope)

Gnathostomata – jawed fishes

Chondrichthyes – cartilaginous fishes

Elasmobranchii – sharks and rays
Order Myliobatiformes – stingrays
Family Myliobatidae – eagle rays 
Manta, Manta birostris(Donndorff, 1798) (possibly circumtropical, from the Cape eastwards)
Eagle ray, Myliobatis aquila (Linnaeus, 1758) (Namibia to KwaZulu-Natal)
Bullray, Pteromylaeus bovinus (Saint-Hilaire, 1817) (south-western Cape to Zanzibar)

Order Rajiformes – rays, skates and guitarfish
Family Dasyatidae – stingrays
Short tailed stingray, Dasyatis brevicaudata (Hutton, 1875) (False Bay to Delagoa Bay)
Blue stingray, Dasyatis chrysonota (Smith, 1828) (Central Angola to Delagoa Bay) (syn. Dasyatis marmoratis)

Family Rajidae – skates
Bathyraja smithii (Müller & Henle, 1841) (Agulhas bank and west of Cape Town)
Cruriraja durbanensis (von Bonde and Swart, 1923) (off Western Cape province)
Cruriraja parcomaculata von Bonde and Swart, 1923 (Lüderitz to Durban)
Neoraja stehmanni (Hulley, 1972) (west of Cape Town to south of Agulhas Bank)
Raja caudaspinosa von Bonde and Swart, 1923 (Luderitz to Cape Point)
Thornback skate, Raja clavata Linnaeus, 1758 (Walvis Bay to Durban)
Raja confundens Hulley, 1970 (West coast from 19°S to east of Cape Point)
Raja dissimilis Hulley, 1970 (west of Cape Town)
Raja leopardus von Bonde and Swart, 1923 (west coast from 18°S to 35°S)
Twineye skate, Raja miraletus Linnaeus, 1758 (False Bay to Durban)
Raja pullopunctata Smith, 1964 (Luderitz to Mozambique)
Raja ravidula Hulley, 1970 (off Cape Town)
Raja robertsi Hulley, 1970 (west of Cape Town)
Raja spinacidermis Barnard, 1923 (off west coast)
Biscuit skate or false thornback skate, Raja straeleni Poll, 1951 (West Africa to East London)
Blancmange skate, Raja Wallacei Hulley, 1970 (Cape to Limpopo river mouth)
Spearnose skate, Rostroraja alba (Lacepède, 1803) (West Africa to Madagascar) (syn. Raja alba)

Family Rhinobatidae – guitarfish
Lesser sandshark or lesser guitarfish, Rhinobatos annulatus Smith in Müller & Henle, 1841 (Cape Columbine to Mozambique)
Bluntnose guitarfish, Rhinobatos blochii Müller & Henle, 1841 (Cape to Walvis Bay)

Order Torpediniformes – electric rays
Family Narkidae
Onefin electric ray or torpedo ray, Narke capensis (Gmelin, 1789) (Atlantic coast of Cape Peninsula to Madagascar)

Family Torpedinidae
Blackspotted electric ray, Torpedo fuscomaculata Peters, 1855 (Cape Columbine to Mozambique)
Atlantic electric ray, Torpedo nobiliana Bonaparte, 1835 (Western Cape coast to Algoa Bay)

Order Carcharhiniformes – ground sharks
Family Carcharhinidae – requiem sharks 
Copper shark, Carcharhinus brachyurus (Günther, 1870) (Namibia to Durban)
Dusky shark, Carcharhinus obscurus (Lesueur, 1818) (Cape Point to Mozambique)
Blue shark, Prionace glauca (Linnaeus, 1758) (off south-western Cape coast)

Family Scyliorhinidae – catsharks 
Apristurus microps (Gilchrist, 1922) (Western Cape to Agulhas)
Apristurus saldanha (Barnard 1925) (Saldanha Bay)
Tiger catshark, Halaelurus natalensis (Regan, 1904) (Saldanha Bay to Algoa Bay)
Puffadder shyshark or happy Eddie, Haploblepharus edwardsii (Schinz, 1822) (Cape Point to central KwaZulu-Natal)
Dark shyshark, dusky shyshark or skaamoog, Haploblepharus pictus (Müller & Henle, 1838) (Namibia to Cape Agulhas)
Holohalaelurus regani (Gilchrist, 1922) (south-western Cape to Zanzibar)
Pyjama catshark or striped catshark, Poroderma africanum (Gmelin, 1789) (Cape Columbine to central KwaZulu-Natal)
Leopard catshark, Poroderma pantherinum (Müller & Henle, 1838) (Cape Columbine to Durban)
Yellowspotted catshark, Scylliorhinus capensis (Smith, 1838) (south-western Cape to KwaZulu-Natal)
 
Family Sphyrnidae – hammerhead sharks 
Smooth hammerhead, Sphyrna zygaena (Linnaeus, 1758) (south Cape to southern Mozambique, occasionally on west coast. Warm temperate waters of both hemispheres)

Family Triakidae – houndsharks 
Soupfin shark, Galeorhinus galeus (Linnaeus, 1758) (Angola to East London)
Smooth-hound shark, Mustelus mustelus (Linnaeus, 1758) (Namibia to KwaZulu-Natal)
Whitespotted smooth-hound, Mustelus palumbes Smith, 1957 (Walvis Bay to Algoa Bay)
Spotted gully shark, Triakis megalopterus (Smith, 1839) (Walvis Bay to East London)

Order Hexanchiformes – cow and frill sharks
Family Hexanchidae – cow sharks 
Sixgill shark, Hexanchus griseus (Bonnaterre, 1788) (All oceans)
Bigeye sixgill shark, Hexanchus vitulus Springer and Waller, 1969 (Atlantic, south-west Indian Ocean)
Spotted sevengill cowshark or broadnose sevengill shark, Notorynchus cepedianus (Péron, 1807) (Namibia to East London)

Order Lamniformes – mackerel sharks
Family Alopiidae – thresher sharks
Thintail thresher, Alopias vulpinus (Bonnaterre, 1788) (throughout SA waters, more common in southern part)

Family Cetorhinidae – basking sharks
Basking shark, Cetorhinus maximus (Gunnerus, 1765) (temperate waters of all oceans, a few records from south-western Cape)

Family Lamnidae – mackerel sharks
Great white shark, Carcharodon carcharias (Linnaeus, 1758) (Namibia to Mozambique)
Shortfin mako, Isurus oxyrinchus Rafinesque, 1810 (warm temperate and tropical waters of all oceans)
Porbeagle, Lamna nasus (Bonnaterre, 1788) (Temperate oceans, recorded from False Bay and possibly Knysna)

Family Mitsukurinidae – goblin sharks
Goblin shark, Mitsukurina owstoni Jordan, 1898 (west of Cape Town, and off Transkei coast)
 
Family Odontaspididae
Ragged-tooth shark or spotted ragged-tooth shark, Carcharias taurus Rafinesque, 1810 (Cape Point to Mozambique) (syn. Eugomphodus taurus)

Family Pseudocarchariidae – crocodile sharks
Crocodile shark, Pseudocarcharias kamoharai (Matsubara, 1936) (once found near Cape Town)

Order Orectolobiformes – carpet sharks
Family Rhincodontidae – whale sharks 
Whale shark, Rhincodon typus Smith, 1828 (type specimen from Table Bay, normally northern KwaZulu-Natal)

Order Pristiophoriformes – sawsharks
Family Pristiophoridae
Sixgill sawshark, Pliotrema warreni Regan, 1906 (False Bay to southern Mozambique)

Order Squaliformes – dogfish sharks
Family Echinorhinidae – bramble sharks
Bramble shark, Echinorhinus brucus (Bonnaterre, 1788) (Namibia to southern KwaZulu-Natal)

Family Squalidae – dogfishes
Centrophorus granulosus (Bloch and Schneider, 1801) (Western Cape)
Centrophorus squamosis Bonnaterre, 1788 (Western Cape and Algoa Bay)
Centroscyllium fabricii (Reinhardt, 1825) (Western Cape)
Centroscymnus crepidater (Bocage and Capello, 1864) (Western Cape)
Deania calcea (Lowe, 1839) (Cape Point and Algoa Bay)
Deania profundorum (Smith and Radcliffe, 1912) (West coast and KwaZulu-Natal)
Deania quadrispinosus (McCulloch, 1915) (northern Namibia to southern Mozambique)
Etmopterus brachurus Smith and Radcliffe, 1912 (Western Cape, KwaZulu-Natal and southern Mozambique)
Etmopterus granulosus (Günther, 1880) (Cape Point)
Etmopterus sp. (off south-western Cape Province, northern KwaZulu-Natal)
Euprotomicroides zantedeschia Hulley and Penrith, 1966 (west of Cape Town)
Euprotomicrus bispinatus (Quoy and Gaimard, 1824) (all oceans)
Flatiron shark, Oxynotus centrina (Linnaeus, 1758) (Walvis Bay to Cape Town)
Greenland shark, Somniosus microcephalus (Schneider, 1801) (off Cape Columbine)
Spotted spiny dogfish, Squalus acanthias Linnaeus, 1758 (south-western Cape to Port Elizabeth)
Bluntnose spiny dogfish, Squalus megalops (MacLeay, 1882) (Namibia to southern Mozambique)
Longnose spiny dogfish, Squalus mitsukurii Jordan and Fowler, 1903 (Orange river to Beira)

Holocephali – chimaeras

Order Chimaeriformes
Family Callorhinchidae – elephantfish
St Joseph shark or elephant fish, Callorhinchus capensis Duméril, 1865 (Namibia to central KwaZulu-Natal)

Family Chimaeridae – chimaeras
Cape chimaera, Chimaera sp. (Luderitz to Cape Point)

Family Rhinochimaeridae – longnose chimaeras
Harriotta raleighana Goode and Bean, 1895 (off Western Cape)
Rhinochimaera africana Compagno, Stehman and Ebert, 1990 (west coast off Doring Bay and Cape Columbine, Natal coast off Kosi Bay)
Rhinochimaera atlantica Holt and Byrne, 1909 (Namibia to Plettenberg Bay)

Class Actinopterygii – ray finned fishes

Order Anguilliformes – eels
Family Anguillidae – freshwater eels
Madagascar mottled eel, Anguilla marmorata Quoy and Gaimard, 1824 (Western Cape to Kenya)
Longfin eel, Anguilla mossambica (Peters, 1852) (most waters from the Cape northwards)

Family Congridae – conger eels
Hairy conger, Bassanago albescens (Barnard, 1923) (Cape Point)
Bathyuroconger vicinus (Vaillant, 1888) (off Cape Point)
Cape conger, Conger wilsoni (Bloch and Schneider 1801) (Cape to southern Mozambique)
Southern conger, Gnathophis capensis (Kaup, 1856) (False Bay to Plettenberg Bay)
Strap conger, Gnathophis habenatus (Richardson, 1848) (southern Cape to East London)

Family Derichthyidae – longneck eels
Derichthys serpentinus Gill, 1884 (west of Cape Town; worldwide)
Duckbill oceanic eel, spoonbill eel, Nessorhamphus ingolfianus (Schmidt, 1912) (off the Cape, also worldwide)

Family Nemichthyidae – snipe eels
Avocettina acuticeps (Regan, 1916) (offshore Cape to Natal)
Nemichthys curvirostris (Strömman, 1896) (off the Cape)
Slender snipe-eel, Nemichthys scolopaceus (Richardson, 1848) (off the Cape to Natal)

Family: Nettastomatidae – witch eels
Venefica proboscidea (Vaillant, 1888) (off the Cape)

Family Ophichthidae – snake-eels and worm-eels
Slender snake-eel, Ophichthus serpentinus Seale, 1917. syn. Ophichthus bennettai (Cape Province west coast)

Family Serrivomeridae – sawtooth eels
Stout sawpalate, Serrivomer beanii Gill and Ryder, 1883 (off Cape and Natal)

Family Synaphobranchidae – cutthroat eels
Basketwork eel, Diastobranchus capensis Barnard, 1923 (off Cape Point)
Ilyophis brunneus Gilbert, 1892 (off the Cape)
Snubnose eel, Simenchelys parasitica Gill, 1879 (off the Cape)
Northern cutthroat eel, slatjaw cutthroat eel, Synaphobranchus kaupii Johnson, 1862 (off the Cape)

Order Ateleopodiformes
Family Ateleopodidae – tadpole fishes
Ateleopus natalensis Regan, 1921 (Cape to Red Sea)
Guentherus altivela Osorio, 1917 (West coast of Africa from Cabo Blanco to the Cape)
Ijimaia loppei Roule, 1922 (Morocco to Cape Peninsula)

Order Atheriniformes
Family Atherinidae – silversides
 Cape silverside, Atherina breviceps Valenciennes, 1835 (Luderitz to northern KwaZulu-Natal)

Order Aulopiformes
Family Alepisauridae – lancetfishes
Longsnout lancetfish, Alepisaurus ferox Lowe, 1833 (Walvis Bay to Sodwana Bay; in all major oceans)

Family Bathysauropsidae
Bathysauropsis gracilis (Günther, 1878) (off Cape Point; circumglobal in southern oceans)

Family Chlorophthalmidae – greeneyes
Chlorophthalmus punctatus Gilchrist, 1904 (both coasts of South Africa)

Family Evermannellidae – sabretooth fishes
Coccorella atlantica (Parr, 1928) (central water areas of all 3 major oceans; off western and south-western Cape coast, 1 specimen from 31°34'S, 30°09'E)

Family Ipnopidae
Bathypterois filiferus Gilchrist, 1906 (off Cape Point)
Bathypterois phenax Parr, 1928 (off Cape Point)
Ipnops agassizii Garman, 1899 (off Cape Point)

Family Notosudidae – notosudids
Scopelosaurus ahlstromi Bertelsen, Krefft and Marshall, 1976 (all 3 oceans from about 32° to 45°S)
Scopelosaurus hamiltoni (Waite, 1916) (southern oceans from about 30° to 60°S)
Scopelosaurus herwigi Bertelson, Kreft and Marshall, 1976 (slope areas of Southern Africa)
Scopelosaurus meadi Bertelson, Krefft and Marshall, 1976 (from about 19° to 43°S)

Family Paralepididae – barracudinas 
Lestidiops jayakari (Boulenger, 1889) (worldwide in tropical to temperate waters)
Macroparalepis affinis Ege, 1933 (anti-tropical in Atlantic Ocean)
Magnisudis prionosa (Rofen, 1963) (circumglobal in southern oceans from 20°S to Antarctic)
Arctozenus risso (Bonaparte, 1840) (syn, Notolepis rissoi) (worldwide in temperate and tropical waters)
Sudis hyalina Rafinesque, 1810 (Atlantic Ocean from 50°N to South Africa)

Family Scopelarchidae – pearleyes
Benthalbella infans Zugmayer, 1911 (off south-western Cape; tropical/subtropical in all 3 major oceans)
Benthalbella macropinna Bussing and Bussing, 1966 (off south-western Cape coast; circumpolar in subantarctic and Antarctic waters)
Scopelarchus analis (Brauer, 1902) (common off southern Africa; tropical/subtropical all oceans)

Order Batrachoidiformes
Family Batrachoididae – toadfishes
Snakehead toadfish, Batrichthys apiatus (Valenciennes, 1837) (Saldanha Bay to Umtata River, Transkei)
Pleated toadfish, Chatrabus felinus (Smith, 1952). syn. Batrichthys felinus (Cape to Port Alfred)

Order Beloniformes
Family Exocoetidae – flyingfishes
 Smallhead flyingfish, Cheilopogon pinnatibarbatus altipinnis (Valenciennes, 1846) (Cape to Kosi Bay))
 Subtropical flyingfish, Hirundichthys rondeletii (Valenciennes, 1846) (widely distributed in subtropical waters of all oceans, common off the Cape)
 Mirrorwing flyingfish, Hirundichthys speculiger (Valenciennes, 1846) (worldwide in tropical waters, one juvenile from Mbibi, Zululand, another from False Bay)

Family Hemiramphidae – halfbeaks
 Ribbon halfbeak, Euleptorhamphus viridis (van Hasselt, 1823) (reported from Table Bay, also known from Algoa Bay and Kei River mouth, tropical and temperate waters of Indo-Pacific))
 Cape halfbeak, Hyporhamphus capensis (Thominot, 1886) (False Bay to southern Mozambique))

Family Belonidae – needlefishes
 Cape needlefish, Petalichthys capensis Regan, 1904 (False Bay to Pondoland)

Family Scomberesocidae – sauries
 Dwarf saury, Nanichthys simulans Hubbs and Wisner, 1980 (off the Cape up the west coast, warm temperate waters of the Atlantic and southern Indian oceans)

Order Beryciformes
Family Berycidae – berycids
 Beryx, Beryx decadactylus Cuvier, 1829 (Saldanha Bay to Natal)
 Slender beryx, Beryx splendens Lowe, 1834 (Saldanha Bay to Natal)
 Short alfonsino, Centroberyx spinosus (Gilchrist, 1903) (False Bay and Storms River to Durban)

Family Monocentridae – pineapple fishes
 Pineapple fish, Monocentris japonicus (Houttuyn, 1782) (Indo-West Pacific and Red Sea south to Mossel Bay)(Recorded from False Bay on at least two occasions)

Family Trachichthyidae – slimeheads
 Gephyroberyx darwini (Johnson, 1866) (all round South African coast)
 Hoplostethus atlanticus Collett, 1896 (From Iceland to Morocco and Walvis Bay to off Durban)
 Black slimehead, Hoplostethus cadenati Quero, 1974 (West coast of Africa from 36°N – 26°S, and off Transkei)
 Hoplostethus mediterraneus Cuvier, 1829 (Namibia to Natal)
 Hoplostethus melanops (Weber, 1913) (Indo-West pacific from Indonesia to Natal, also off Namibia and Cape Town)

Order Clupeiformes
Family Clupeidae – herrings, sardines and pilchards
Round sardinelle, Sardinella aurita Valenciennes, 1847 (Walvis Bay to Saldanha Bay)
Pilchard or sardine, Sardinops sagax (Jenyns, 1842) (Namibia to Mozambique)

Family Dussumieriidae
Roundherring, Etrumeus whiteheadi Wongratana, 1983 (Walvis Bay to KwaZulu-Natal)

Family Engraulidae – anchovies
Cape anchovy, Engraulis japonicus Temminck & Schlegel, 1846 (Walvis Bay to Mozambique and Indo-Pacific)

Order Elopiformes
Family Elopidae – ladyfishes
Atlantic ladyfish, Elops lacerta Valenciennes, 1846 (Atlantic coast to 23°S)

Order Gadiformes
Family: Bregmacerotidae – codlets
Antenna codlet, Bregmaceros atlanticus Goode and Bean, 1886 (off south Cape and Natal coasts; circumtropical)
Spotted codlet, Bregmaceros mcclellandi Thompson, 1840 (from Cape eastwards; circumtropical but not known from east Pacific)
Bregmaceros nectabanus Whitley, 1941 (Cape eastwards to tropical Indo-West Pacific; Tropical eastern Atlantic)

Family Gadidae – cods
Cape rockling, Gaidropsarus capensis (Kaup, 1858) (Cape Town to East London)
Comb rockling, Gaidropsaris insularum Sivertsen, 1945 (Cape Peninsula and West coast)

Family Macrouridae – grenadiers
Bathygadus favosus Goode and Bean, 1886 (off Cape Town)
Bathygadus melanobranchus Vaillant, 1888 (Table Bay and Natal coast. Unverified, specimens missing)
Surgeon grenadier, Coelorhinchus acanthiger Barnard, 1925 (off Namibia to Cape Point)
Shovelnose grenadier, Coelorhinchus braueri Barnard, 1925 (Saldanha and Table Bay, Cape Point, East London; Angola to Mozambique)
Abyssal grenedier, armoured rat-tail, russet grenadier, smoothscale rattail, Coryphaenoides armatus (Hector, 1875) (abyssal, all oceans except Arctic. One Atlantic record off South Africa)
Coryphaenoides striaturus Barnard, 1925 (off Cape Point)
Gadomus capensis, (Gilchrist and von Bonde, 1924) (Table Bay to Mozambique)
Bigeye grenadier, Macrourus holotrachys Günther, 1878 (Cape Point and Prince Edward Island; also off New Zealand and southwestern Australia)
Softhead grenadier, softhead rat-tail, Malacocephalus laevis (Lowe, 1843) (off South Africa; widespread in Atlantic and Indian oceans)
Nezumia brevibarbata (Barnard, 1925) (Cape Point; known only off the Cape, where it is common)
Kuronezumia leonis (Barnard, 1925), sun. Nezumia leonis (off Cape Point, Namibia, southwestern Atlantic)Bailly, N. (2013). Kuronezumia leonis (Barnard, 1925). In: Froese, R. and D. Pauly. Editors. (2013) FishBase. Accessed through: World Register of Marine Species on 2013-04-27
Roughsnout grenadier, roughsnout rat-tail, Trachyrincus scabrus (Rafinesque, 1810) (Namibia, west coast of South Africa; eastern North Atlantic and Mediterranean sea)

Family Melanonidae – melanonids
Pelagic cod, Melanonus gracilis Günther, 1878 (circum-Antarctic south of Subtropical convergence; off Cape Peninsula)

Family Merlucciidae – hakes
Lyconodes argenteus (Gilchrist, 1922) (west of Cape of Good Hope)
Cape hake, shallow water hake, stockfish, South African whiting, Merluccius capensis Castelnau, 1861 (Namibia to East London)
Deep water hake, deep-water Cape hake, Merluccius paradoxus Franca, 1960 (Cape Frio to East London)

Family Moridae – deepsea cods
Blackcod, blue antimora, blue hake, Antimora rostrata (Günther, 1878) (locally abundant, found in most oceans)
 Guttigadus globiceps (Gilchrist, 1906), syn. Laemonema globiceps (off south-western Cape coast)
Lepidion capensis Gilchrist, 1922 (Cape to East London)
Physiculus capensis Gilchrist, 1922 (Cape Peninsula to East London)
Tripterophycis gilchristi Boulenger, 1902 (upper slope off the Cape and Durban)

Order Gonorynchiformes
Family Gonorynchidae – beaked sandfish
Beaked sandfish, Gonorynchus gonorynchus (Linnaeus 1766) (Cape of Good Hope)

Order Lampriformes
Family Lampridae – opahs 
Spotted opah, Jerusalem haddock, moonfish, Lampris guttatus (Brünnich, 1788) (all oceans but not in polar waters, occurs throughout South African waters, usually well offshore)
Southern opah, Lampris immaculatus Gilchrist, 1904 (circumglobal south of 30°S)

Family Lophotidae – crestfishes
Unicorn crestfish, Eumecichthys fiski (Günther, 1890) (1 specimen, Kalk Bay in False Bay)
Crestfish, Lophotus lacepede Giorna, 1809 (Cape to Plettenberg Bay, rare but widely distributed in all oceans)

Family Radiicephalidae – tapertails
Tapertail, Radiicephalus elongatus Osorio, 1917 (70 miles SW of Cape Point)

Family Regalecidae – oarfishes
Streamer fish, Agrostichthys parkeri (Benham 1904) (southeast Atlantic, New Zealand and Tasmania)
Oarfish, Regalescus glesne Ascanius, 1772 (worldwide distribution)

Family Trachipteridae – ribbonfishes
Polka-dot ribbonfish, Desmodema polysticum (Ogilby, 1897) (1 juvenile washed ashore at Xora river and 1 found at Simon's Town, False Bay)
Blacktail ribbonfish, Trachipterus jacksonensis (Ramsay, 1881) (East London and off Cape Town)
Peregrine ribbonfish, Trachipterus trachypterus (Gmelin, 1789) (off Table Bay)
Taper tail ribbonfish, Zu elongatus (Heemstra and Kannemeyer, 1984) (4 specimens trawled off the western Cape coast)

Family Lophiidae – monks
Blackmouth angler, Lophiomus setigerus (Vahl, 1797) (Indo-West Pacific south to False Bay)
Monkfish, devil anglerfish, Lophius vomerinus (Valenciennes, 1837), syn. Lophius upsicephalus (off Cape of Good Hope; eastern South Atlantic and south western Indian Ocean off South Africa; Bay of Bengal off Burma)

Family Ceratiidae – seadevils
Deepsea angler, twoclub angler, Ceratias holboelli Krøyer, 1845 (single specimen off Cape Town at 34°12'S, 16°35'E; nearly cosmopolitan in the world's oceans)
Ceratias tentaculatus (Norman, 1930) (off Saldanha Bay, off southern Natal, off Delagoa Bay and throughout southern oceans)
Triplewart seadevil, Cryptopsaras couesii Gill, 1883 (off Cape of Good Hope, all major oceans)
 
Family Himantolophidae – footballfish
Atlantic footballfish, Himantolophus groenlandicus Reinhardt, 1837 (all major oceans)

Family Melanocetidae – devil-anglers
Melanocetus johnsonii Günther, 1864 (off all coasts of South Africa; all major oceans)

Order Lophiiformes – anglerfishes
Family Antennariidae – anglers
Sargassum fish, Histrio histrio (Linnaeus, 1758) (Cape Point to Mozambique)

Order Myctophiformes
Family Myctophidae – lanternfishes
Bolinichthys supralateralis (Parr, 1928) (off Cape Peninsula and in Agulgas current; Atlantic (40°N – 02°S and 32° to 40°S); Indian Ocean (21° – 30°S); west coast of Australia and near Hawaii)
Diaphus effulgens (Goode and Bean, 1896) (off all SA coasts)
Diaphus mollis Tåning, 1928 (off all SA coasts, broadly tropical distribution in all major oceans)
Diaphus taaningi Norman, 1930 (over west coast continental shelf/slope southward to 24°S. Amphitropical species in Atlantic (western sector); tropical waters to 42°N; eastern sector: southward from Mauretanian upwelling region to South African region)
Electrona risso (Cocco, 1829) (off east and west coasts of South Africa. Widespread in Atlantic (55°N – 40°S), Mediterranean, Indian Ocean (0° – 40°S), Tasman sea and Cook Strait, and eastern Pacific (42°N – 20°S))
Gonichthys barnesi Whitley, 1943 (off east and west coasts, south of 30°S. Convergence species in all 3 oceans (30° – 40°S))
Gymnoscopelus braueri (Lönnberg, 1905) (circumglobal between Subtropical convergence and Antarctica)
Hygophum hanseni (Tåning, 1932) (from 30°S on west coast to 33°S on east coast. Convergence species (30° to 43°S) in all 3 oceans)
Hygophum hygomii (Lütken, 1892) (west of Cape Peninsula and off east coast (25° – 37°S))
Hygophum proximum Bekker, 1965) (south to about 37°S in Agulhas current; Indian Ocean (25°N – 10°S))
Lampadena notialis Nafpaktitis and Paxton, 1968 (Off east coast and Cape Peninsula; convergence species in all 3 oceans)
Mirror lampfish, mirror lanternfish, Lampadena speculigera Goode and Bean, 1896 (off west and southeast coasts. Atlantic (66° – 35°N and 35° – 45°S), Indian Ocean (30° to 45°S) and Pacific Ocean (30° – 45°S))
Lampanyctus alatus Goode and Bean, 1896 (off all South African coasts; Atlantic (46°N – 38°S), Indian Ocean (0° – 39°S)
Southern lanternfish, Lampanyctus australis Tåning, 1932 (off all South African coasts; circumglobal convergence species (33° – 43°S with northern extension to about 27°S in eastern boundary currents))
Lampanyctus festivus Tåning, 1928 (off all South African coasts. Atlantic(53° – 18°N and 28° – 40°S with northern extension to 12°S in Benguela current and Indo-West Pacific.)
Lampanyctus lepidolychnus Bekker, 1967 (off all South African coasts, circumglobal convergence species (23° – 48°S))
Rakery beaconlamp, Lampanyctus macdonaldi (Goode and Bean, 1896) (west of Cape Peninsula, circumglobal between subtropical convergence and Antarctic polar front)
Lampanyctus pusillus (Johnson, 1890) (off all South African coasts. Bisubtropical species in all major oceans)
Lampichthys procerus (Brauer, 1904) (off Cape Peninsula, circumglobal convergence species (32° – 48°S) with extensions into lower latitudes in eastern boundary currents)
Lobianchia dofleini (Zugmayer, 1911) (off all South African coasts. Mediterranean, Atlantic (50°N – 40°S), Indian Ocean (23° – 38°S), Tasman sea and south Pacific(region of subtropical convergence))
Lobianchia gemellarii (Cocco, 1838) (off all South African coasts, worldwide in tropical/subtropical waters)
Metelectrona ventralis (Bekker, 1063) (west of Cape Peninsula in southern Benguela upwelling region; circumglobal subantarctic species (36°-51°S))
Myctophum phengodes (Lütken, 1892) (off all South African coasts)
Myctophum selenops Tåning, 1928 (west of Cape peninsula in Agulhas water pockets)
Nannobrachium atrum (Tåning, 1928), syn. Lampanyctus ater (off all South African coasts; Atlantic (58° – 17°N and 15° – 40°S) and Indian Ocean (12° – 44°S))
Notolychnus valdiviae (Brauer, 1904) (off all South African coasts)
Patchwork lampfish, Notoscopelus resplendens (Richardson, 1845) (off all South African coasts)
Protomyctophum normani Tåning, 1932 (once west of Slangkop lighthouse; circumglobal convergence species (36° – 43°S))
Scopelopsis multipunctatus Brauer, 1906 (off all South African coasts)
Symbolophorus barnardi (Tåning, 1932) (off all South African coasts)

Order Notacanthiformes
Family Halosauridae – halosaurs
Gilbert's halosaurid, Aldrovandia affinis (Günther, 1877) (both coasts of SA; cicumglobal tropical and temperate)
Hawaiian halosaurid, Aldrovandia phalacra (Vaillant, 1888) (off Cape Point)
Abyssal halosaur, Halosauropsis macrochir (Günther, 1878) (off Cape Point)
Halosaurus ovenii Johnson, 1863 (off Cape Point to Walvis Bay)

Family Notacanthidae – spiny eels
Notacanthus sexspinis Richardson, 1846 (Walvis Bay to Durban)
Polyacanthonotus africanus (Gilchrist and von Bonde, 1924) (off Cape Point)
Shortspine tapirfish, Polyacanthonotus rissoanus (De Filippi & Verany, 1857) (off Cape Point to Table Bay)

Order Ophidiiformes
Family Aphyonidae – aphyonids
Barathronus bicolor? Goode and Bean, 1886 (off Cape Point, specimen lost, identification dubious)

Family Bythitidae – bythitids or brotulas
Cataetyx niki Cohen, 1981 (2 specimens from off the Cape)
Lesser orange brotula, Dermatopsoides talboti Cohen, 1966 (Saldanha Bay to Algoa Bay)

Family Ophidiidae – cuskeels
Slender brotula, Dicrolene multifilis (Alcock, 1889) (off Table Bay and east coast of South Africa)
Kingklip, Genypterus capensis (Smith, 1847) (Walvis Bay to Algoa Bay)
Penopus microphthalmus (Vaillant, 1888) (one specimen off the Cape)
Slender cuskeel, Porogadus miles Goode and bean, 1886 (one specimen off the Cape; relatively common both sides of the Atlantic; also recorded from Indian Ocean)
Barbed brotula, Selachophidium guentheri Gilchrist, 1903 (Angola to Mozambique)

Order Osmeriformes
Family Alepocephalidae – slickheads
Alepocephalus australis Barnard 1923 (off Cape Point; apparently widely distributed in temperate waters of southern hemisphere)
Atlantic gymnast, English bluntsnout smoothhead, Xenodermichthys copei (Gill, 1884) (common off South Africa)

Family Opisthoproctidae – barreleyes
Rhynchohyalus natalensis (Gilchrist and von Bonde, 1924) (off Cape Town to Bermuda)

Family Microstomatidae
Nansenia macrolepis (Gilchrist, 1922) (west of Cape Peninsula; off Natal)

Family Bathylagidae
Bathylagus bericoides (Borodin, 1929) (off Cape Town, throughout tropical and subtropical seas)

Order Perciformes
Family Luvaridae – louvar
 Louvar, Luvarus imperialis Rafinesque, 1810 (All oceans and Mediterranean sea, not reported in polar seas or near equator)

Family Blenniidae – blennies
 Looseskin blenny, Chalaroderma capito (Valenciennes, 1836) (Saldanha Bay to East London)
 Two-eyed blenny, Chalaroderma ocellata (Gilchrist and Thompson, 1908) ((Saldanha Bay to Port Elizabeth)
 Horned blenny, Parablennius cornutus (Linnaeus, 1758) (Northern Namibia to Sodwana Bay, Endemic)
 Piano blenny, Plagiotremus tapeinosoma (Bleeker, 1857) (Indo-Pacific south to False Bay)
 Maned blenny, Scartella emarginata (Günther, 1861) (Southern Angola to India)
 Japanese snakeblenny, Xiphasia matsubarai Okada & Suzuki, 1952 (Western Indian Ocean south to False Bay)
 Snakeblenny, Xiphasia setifer Swainson, 1839 (Red Sea to False Bay)

Family Clinidae – klipfishes
 Lace klipfish, Blennioclinus brachycephalus (Valenciennes, 1836) (Melkboschstrand to Kei River)
 Snaky klipfish, Blenniophis anguillaris (Valenciennes, 1836) (Lüderitz Bay to East London)
 Striped klipfish, Blenniophis striatus (Gilchrist & Thompson, 1908) (Saldanha Bay to East London)
 Slender platanna-klipfish, Cancelloxus burrelli Smith, 1961 (Orange River to Algoa Bay)
 Elongated sand klipfish, Cancelloxus longior Prochazka & Griffiths, 1991 (Both sides of the peninsula)
 Barbelled klipfish, Cirrhibarbus capensis Valenciennes, 1836 (Lamberts Bay to East London)
 Fleet klipfish, Climacoporus navalis Barnard, 1935 (Still Bay to Port St, Johns. Once from False Bay)
 Ladder klipfish, Clinoporus biporosus (Gilchrist and Thompson, 1908) (Saldanha Bay to False Bay)
 Sad klipfish, Clinus acuminatus (Schneider, 1801) (Lüderitz Bay to west of Algoa Bay)
 Agile klipfish, Clinus agilis Smith, 1931 (Namibia (20°49'S) to Port Alfred)
 Onrust klipfish, Clinus berrisfordi Penrith, 1967 (Weedy areas of False Bay to Skoenmakerskop, just west of Algoa Bay)
 Cape klipfish, Clinus brevicristatus Gilchrist & Thompson, 1908 (Lamberts Bay to False Bay)
 Bluntnose klipfish, Clinus cottoides Valenciennes, 1836 (Olifants River (Western Cape) to Kei River)
 West coast klipfish, Clinus heterodon Valenciennes, 1836 (Orange River to Cape Agulhas)
 False Bay klipfish, Clinus latipennis Valenciennes, 1836 (Table Bay to Cape Agulhas)
 Chinese klipfish, Clinus nemopterus Günther, 1861 (False Bay and Algoa Bay)
 Robust klipfish, Clinus robustus Gilchrist & Thompson, 1908 (Cape of Good Hope to East London)
 Kelp klipfish, Clinus rotundifrons Barnard, 1937 (Lüderitz Bay to Cape of Good Hope)
 Super klipfish or highfin klipfish, Clinus superciliosus (Linnaeus, 1758) (Namibia (18°59'S) to Kei River)
 Bull klipfish, Clinus taurus Gilchrist & Thompson, 1908 (Möwe Point (Namibia) to Port Alfred)
 Speckled klipfish, Clinus venustris Gilchrist & Thompson, 1908 (Orange River to East London)(Lüderitz Bay to Port Alfred)
 Mousey klipfish, Fucomimus mus (Gilchrist & Thompson, 1908) (False Bay to Coffee Bay)
 Nosestripe klipfish, Muraenoclinus dorsalis (Bleeker, 1860) (Orange River to Durban)(Lüderitz Bay to southern Natal)
 Grass klipfish, Pavoclinus graminis (Gilchrist & Thompson, 1908) (False Bay to Inhambane)
 Slinky klipfish, Pavoclinus litorafontis Penrith, 1965 (False Bay; Strandfontein and Onrust River mouth)
 Peacock klipfish, Pavoclinus pavo (Gilchrist & Thompson, 1908) (Lüderitz Bay to Kei River)
 Deepwater klipfish, Pavoclinus profundus Smith, 1961 (Cape Peninsula, off Knysna to Algoa Bay)
 Deep reef klipfish, Pavoclinus smalei Heemstra & Wright, 1986 (False Bay, off Storm's River mouth)
 Leafy klipfish, Smithichthys fucorum (Gilchrist & Thompson, 1908) (Cape Point to Bashee River)
 Platanna klipfish, Xenopoclinus kochi Smith, 1948 (Lamberts Bay to Algoa Bay)
 Leprous platanna klipfish, Xenopoclinus leprosus Smith, 1961 Orange River mouth to Algoa Bay)

Family Tripterygiidae – threefin blennies or triplefins
 Cape triplefin, Cremnochorites capensis (Gilchrist & Thompson, 1908) (False Bay to Port Alfred)

Family Callionymidae – dragonets
 Sand dragonet, Callionymus marleyi Regan, 1919 (Cape of Good Hope eastward to Persian Gulf)
 Ladder dragonet, Paracallionymus costatus (Boulenger, 1898) (Lüderitz Bay to Inhaca)

Family Gobiesocidae – clingfishes
 Chubby clingfish, Apletodon pellegrini (Chabanaud, 1925) (Senegal (west Africa) to Port Alfred)
 Rocksucker, Chorisochismus dentex (Pallas, 1769) (Port Nolloth to northern KwaZulu-Natal)
 Bigeye clingfish, Diplecogaster megalops Briggs, 1955 (False Bay to Durban)
 Weedsucker, Eckloniaichthys scylliorhiniceps Smith, 1943 (Lüderitz to Kei River mouth)

Family: Gobiidae – gobies

Subfamily Gobiinae
Agulhas goby, Caffrogobius agulhensis (Barnard, 1927) (False Bay to East London)
Banded goby, Caffrogobius caffer (Günther, 1874) (Natal to False Bay)
Prison goby, Caffrogobius gilchristi (Boulenger, 1898) (Table Bay to Mozambique Island)(syn. Caffrogobius multifasciatus)
Barehead goby, Caffrogobius nudiceps (Valenciennes, 1827) (Walvis Bay to East London)
Commafin goby, Caffrogobius saldanha (Barnard, 1927) (Saldanha Bay to southern Transkei)
Knysna sandgoby, Psammogobius knysnaensis Smith, 1935 (Port Nolloth to northern KwaZulu-Natal)
Pelagic goby, Sufflogobius bibarbatus (von Bonde, 1923) (Port Nolloth to Saldanha Bay)

Suborder Percoidei

Superfamily: Cirrhitoidea

Family: Cheilodactylidae – fingerfins
Redfingers, Cheilodactylus fasciatus Lacepède, 1803 (Kunene river, Namibia to Durban)
Barred fingerfin, Cheilodactylus pixi Smith, 1980 (Knysna to Coffee Bay)(False Bay to Coffee Bay)
Twotone fingerfin, Chirodactylus brachydactylus (Cuvier, 1830) (Walvis Bay to Delagoa Bay)
Bank steenbras, Chirodactylus grandis (Günther, 1860) (Walvis Bay to possibly Natal)

Superfamily: Percoidea
Family: Acropomatidae – lanternbellies
Howella sherborni (Norman, 1930) (off Cape Town to Natal)

Family: Bramidae – pomfrets
Pomfret, Brama brama (Bonnaterre, 1788) (Algoa Bay to Walvis Bay)
Prickly fanfish, Pterycombus petersii (Hilgendorff, 1878) (Mid Pacific to Africa, south round the Cape of good Hope to Cape Town)
Sickle pomfret, Taractichthys steindachneri (Döderlein, 1883) (Indo-Pacific from California to Zanzibar and south to False Bay)

Family: Callanthiidae – goldies
Goldie, Callanthias legras Smith, 1947 (Dassen Island (Western Cape) to Natal)

Family: Carangidae – kingfishes
Leervis or garrick, Lichia amia (Linnaeus, 1758) (Mediterranean sea south along west coast of Africa and around Cape to Delagoa Bay)
White kingfish, Pseudocarymx dentex (Bloch & Schneider, 1801) (Durban southwards, anti-tropical on both sides of Atlantic, Mediterranean, Indo-West Pacific)
Giant yellowtail, Seriola lalandi Valenciennes, 1833 (Most common on Atlantic Cape waters, but follows the pilchard migration to Transkei and Natal. Circumglobal in subtropical waters)
Maasbanker, Trachurus trachurus (Linnaeus, 1758) (Norway south and round the Cape of Good Hope to Delagoa Bay

Family: Centracanthidae – picarels
Windtoy, Spicara axillaris (Boulanger, 1900) (Known only from Cape Town to Natal)

Family: Chaetodontidae – butterflyfishes
Doublesash butterflyfish, Chaetodon marleyii Regan, 1921 (Lamberts Bay to Maputo. Endemic)

Family: Coryphaenidae – dolphinfish or dorades
Dolphinfish, Coryphaena hippurus Linnaeus,1758 (all tropical and subtropical waters to 35°S)

Family: Dichistiidae – galjoens
Galjoen, Dichistius capensis (Cuvier, 1831) (Southern Angola to Sodwana Bay) (syn. Coracinus capensis)

Family: Echeneidae – remoras
Shark remora, Echineis naucrates Linnaeus, 1758 (Namibia to Mozambique) (all warm waters except eastern Pacific)
Whale remora, Remora australis (Bennett, 1840) (Worldwide, pelagic: found only on cetaceans)
Spearfish remora, Remora brachyptera (Lowe, 1839) (Worldwide, prefers billfishes)
Remora, Remora remora (Linnaeus, 1758) (Worldwide, prefers sharks)
White remora, Remorina albescens (Temminck & Schlegel, 1845) (Worldwide, prefers Manta rays)

Family: Emmelichthyidae – rovers
Southern rover, Emmelichthys nitidus nitidus Richardson 1845 (occasionally take off western Cape coast)

Family: Epigonidae – cardinal fishes (see also Apogonidae)
Pencil cardinal, Epigonus denticulatus Dieuzeide, 1950 (Walvis Bay to Cape Point)
Epigonus pandionus (Goode & Bean, 1881) (Gulf of Guinea to Agulhas Bank)
Epigonus robustus (Barnard, 1927) (off west coast of South Africa)
Telescope cardinal, Epigonus telescopus (Risso, 1810) (Walvis Bay to Cape Town)

Family: Haemulidae – rubberlips and grunters
Spotted grunter, Pomadasys commersonnii (Lacepède, 1801) (False Bay to India)

Family: Kyphosidae – sea chubs
Grey chub, Kyphosus bigibbus Lacepède, 1801 (Red Sea to Cape Point)
Stonebream, Neoscorpis lithophilus (Gilchrist & Thompson, 1908) (False Bay to southern Mozambique)

Family: Malacanthidae – tilefishes
Forktail tilefish, Hoplolatilus fronticinctus (Günther, 1887) (Postlarvae collected off Cape Peninsula; India and Western Pacific)

Family: Monodactylidae – moonies
Cape moony, Monodactylus falciformis Lacepède, 1801 (Red Sea to False Bay)

Family: Oplegnathidae – knifejaws
Cape knifejaw, Oplegnathus conwayi Richardson, 1840 (False Bay to Durban)

Family: Parascorpididae – jutjaw
Jutjaw, Parascorpis typus Bleeker, 1875 (Known only from False Bay to Maputo)

Family: Pentacerotidae – armourheads
Cape armourhead, Pentaceros capensis Cuvier, 1829 (Port Nolloth to Southern Mozambique)
Pelagic armourhead, Pseudopentaceros (Smith, 1844) (Cape Town to Natal)

Family: Polyprionidae – wreckfishes
Wreckfish, Polyprion americanus (Schneider, 1801) (Norway to South Africa)

Family: Pomatomidae – elf
Elf or shad, Pomatomus saltatrix (Linnaeus, 1766)(Namibia to Maputo)

Family: Pseudochromidae – dottybacks
Subfamily: Congrogadinae – snakelets
Snakelet, Halidesmus scapularis Günther, 1872 (Cape Columbine to Transkei)(False Bay to Coffee Bay)

Family: Rachycentridae – cobia
Prodigal son, Rachycentron canadum (Linnaeus, 1766) (Warm waters of the Atlantic and Indo-Pacific, occasionally reaching False Bay)

Family: Sciaenidae – kobs
Kob, giant kob or kabeljou, Argyrosomus japonicus (Temminck & Schlegel, 1843) (Namibia to Natal) previously misidentified as Argyrosomus hololepidotus (Lacepède, 1801)
Geelbek, Atractoscion aequidens (Cuvier, 1830) (Angola to northern KwaZulu-Natal)
Baardman or belman, Umbrina canariensis Valenciennes, 1843 (Morocco to the Cape of Good Hope through to Pakistan)

Family: Scombropidae – gnomefishes
Gnomefish, Scombrops boops (Houttuyn, 1782) (Cape of Good Hope to Delagoa Bay)

Family: Serranidae – rockcods (groupers) and seabasses

Subfamily: Epinephelinae
Yellowbelly rockcod, Epinephelus marginatus (Lowe, 1834) (Namibia to Mozambique) Formerly identified as Epinephelus guaza (Linnaeus, 1758)

Subfamily: Serraninae
Koester, Acanthistius sebastoides (Castelnau, 1861) (Namibia to Mozambique)
Comber, Serranus knysnaensis Gilchrist, 1904 previously identified as serranus cabrilla (Linnaeus, 1758) (Endemic, False Bay to Durban)

Family: Sparidae – seabreams
Carpenter, Argyrozona argyrozona (Valenciennes, 1830) (Cape Columbine to central KwaZulu-Natal)
Fransmadam, Boopsoidea inornata Castelnau, 1861 (Cape Columbine to central KwaZulu-Natal)
Dageraad, Chrysoblephus cristiceps (Valenciennes, 1830) (Cape Point to Durban)
Red stumpnose or Miss Lucy, Chrysoblephus gibbiceps (Valenciennes, 1830) (Cape Point to East London)
Roman, Chrysoblephus laticeps (Valenciennes, 1830) (Cape Point to southern KwaZulu-Natal)(Cape to Mauritius)
Poenskop or black musselcracker, Cymatoceps nasutus (Castelnau, 1861) (Cape Columbine to Durban)
Blacktail, Diplodus capensis (Smith, 1844) (Angola to Madagascar) (syn. Diplodus sargus capensis)
Zebra, Diplodus cervinus hottentotus (Smith, 1844) (Cape Point to Sodwana Bay)
Janbruin, Gymnocrotaphus curvidens Günther, 1859 (Cape Point to Durban)
West coast steenbras, Lithognathus aureti Smith, 1962 (West coast; Cape Town to Angola)
White steenbras, Lithognathus lithognathus (Cuvier, 1829) (Orange River to Durban)
Sand steenbras, Lithognathus mormyrus (Linnaeus, 1758)(Mediterranean to the Cape of Good Hope and round to Mozambique)
Blue hottentot, Pachymetopon aeneum (Gilchrist & Thompson, 1908) (Cape Point to Sodwana Bay)
Hottentot, Pachymetopon blochii (Valenciennes, 1830) (Angola to Cape Agulhas)
Red steenbras, Petrus rupestris (Valenciennes, 1830) (Cape Point to Durban)
Panga, Pterogymnus laniarius (Valenciennes, 1830) (Cape Point to Transkei)(Cape to Beira)
White stumpnose, Rhabdosargus globiceps (Valenciennes, 1830) (Namibia to East London)(Angola to Natal)
Strepie, Sarpa salpa (Linnaeus, 1758) (Cape Columbine to Maputo)(Mediterranean and eastern Atlantic round South Africa to southern Mozambique)
Musselcracker, Sparodon durbanensis (Castelnau, 1861) (Cape Columbine to Durban)
Steentjie, Spondyliosoma emarginatum (Valenciennes, 1830) (Saldanha Bay to Durban)

Suborder: Scombroidei

Family: Gempylidae – snake mackerels
Snake mackerel, Gempylus serpens Cuvier, 1829 (Worldwide in tropical and subtropical waters, sometimes in temperate latitudes)
Escolar, Lepidocybium flavobrunneum (Smith, 1849) (Tropical and subtropical waters of all oceans)
Sackfish, Neoepinnula orientalis (Gilchrist & von Bonde, 1924) (All oceans near edge of continental shelf and islands)
Oilfish, Ruvettus pretiosus Cocco, 1879 (Tropical and temperate parts of all oceans)
Snoek, Thyrsites atun (Euphrasen, 1791) (Namibia to Port Elizabeth)

Family: Istiophoridae – sailfish, spearfishes and marlins
Black marlin, Makaira indica (Cuvier, 1832) (Primarily Indo-Pacific to off Cape of Good Hope)
Blue marlin, Makaira nigricans (Lacepèede, 1802) (Worldwide in all oceans)
White marlin, Tetrapturus albidus Poey, 1861 (Atlantic Ocean)
Shortbill spearfish, Tetrapturus angustirostris Tanaka, 1914 (Off Cape Point and Durban northwards throughout Indo-Pacific)
Striped marlin, Tetrapturus audax (Philippi, 1887) (Primarily Indo-Pacific, but have been caught off Cape Town)
Longbill spearfish, Tetrapturus pfluegeri Robins & de Sylva, 1963 (Apparently restricted to the Atlantic Ocean)

Family: Scombridae – tunas, mackerels and bonitos
Subfamily: Gasterochismatinae
Bigscale mackerel, Gasterochisma melampus Richardson, 1845 (Worldwide in southern ocean, mostly between 35° and 50° S, recorded from Table Bay)

Subfamily: Scombrinae
Wahoo, Acanthocybium solandri (Cuvier, 1831) (Worldwide in tropical and subtropical waters. From South Africa: Algoa Bay, off Durban, and Sodwana Bay. one record west of Cape Point)
Slender tuna, Allothunnus fallai Serventy, 1948 (Worldwide between 20° and 50° S. From South Africa: Miller's Point and Rooikrans in False Bay)
Bullet tuna, Auxis rochei Risso, 1810 (Cosmopolitan in warm waters. From South Africa: Hout Bay, Mossel Bay and Natal)
Frigate tuna, Auxis thazard (Lacepède, 1800)
Skipjack tuna, Katsuwonus pelamis (Linnaeus, 1758) (False Bay, Algoa Bay to Delagoa Bay)
Mackerel, Scomber japonicus Houttuyn, 1782 (Namibia to Maputo)(Cape to Natal, cosmopolitan in warm waters)
Albacore or longfin tunny, Thunnus alalunga (Bonnaterre, 1788) (Off Western Cape, Cosmopolitan between 45°-50°N and 30°-40°S)
Yellowfin tuna, Thunnus albacares (Bonnaterre, 1788) (Angola to Natal)
Southern bluefin tuna, Thunnus maccoyii (Castelnau, 1872) (Off Cape region in winter, probably throughout southern oceans south of 30°S)
Bigeye tuna, Thunnus obesus (Lowe, 1839) (Off Cape region, Worldwide in tropical and subtropical waters)
Bluefin tuna, Thunnus thynnus (Linnaeus, 1758) (Agulhas Bank and False Bay)

Family: Trichiuridae – frostfishes
Buttersnoek, Lepidopus caudatus (Euphrasen, 1788) (Mediterranean, eastern Atlantic from Norway to South Africa, Australia and new Zealand)
Cutlass fish, Trichiurus lepturus Linnaeus, 1758 (Cosmopolitan in tropical and temperate waters)

Family: Xiphiidae – Swordfishes
Swordfish, Xiphias gladius Linnaeus, 1758 (Namibia to Natal)

Suborder: Stromateoidei

Family: Centrolophidae – Ruffs
Black ruff, Centrolophus niger (Gmelin, 1789) (Temperate waters of Australia, New Zealand, South America and South Africa, also North Atlantic and Mediterranean)
Antarctic butterfish, Hyperoglypha antarctica (Carmichael, 1818) (Temperate waters; islands of south Atlantic and southern Indian oceans; New Zealand, southern Australia and South Africa)
Schedophilus huttoni (Waite, 1910) (Circumglobal in southern ocean, taken off Cape Town, common off Namibia)
Black butterfish or peregrine driftfish, Schedophilus velaini (Sauvage, 1879) (Gulf of Guinea, to South Africa)(syn. Hyperoglypha moselii (Cunningham, 1910))
Flabby driftfish, Tubbia tasmanica Whitley, 1943 (Temperate waters of Southern Ocean; New Zealand, Tasmania and South Africa off Natal)

Family: Nomeidae – Driftfishes
Black fathead, Cubiceps baxteri McCulloch, 1923 (Atlantic, Pacific and Indian Oceans)
Blue fathead, Cubiceps caeruleus Regan, 1914 (Southern Atlantic and Pacific Oceans)
Cape fathead, Cubiceps capensis (Smith, 1845) (Probably circumglobal in southern hemisphere)
Longfin fathead, Cubiceps pauciradiatus Günther, 1872 (Atlantic, Pacific and Indian Oceans)
Bluebottle fish, Nomeus gronovi Gmelin, 1789 (Circumglobal in warm waters)
Banded driftfish, Psenes arafurensis Günther, 1889 (Atlantic, Pacific and Indian Ocean)
Freckled driftfish, Psenes cyanophrys Valenciennes, 1883 (Atlantic, Pacific and Indian Oceans)
Silver driftfish, Psenes maculatus Lütken, 1880 (Atlantic, Pacific and Indian Oceans)
Blackrag, Psenes pellucidus Lütken, 1880 (Atlantic, Pacific and Indian Oceans)
Shadow driftfish, Psenes whiteleggi Waite, 1894 (Indian Ocean and Australia)

Family: Ariommatidae
Indian driftfish, Ariomma indica (Day, 1870) (Mossel Bay eastwards to Southern Japan)

Family: Tetragonuridae – Squaretails
Bigeye squaretail, Tetragonuris atlanticus Lowe, 1839 (Atlantic Pacific and Indian oceans)

Family: Stromateidae
Blue butterfish, Stromateus fiatola Linnaeus, 1758 (Eastern Atlantic and Mediterranean round the Cape to Natal)

Suborder: Trachinoidei
Family: Ammodytidae – Sandlances
Cape sandlance, Gymnammodytes capensis (Barnard, 1927) (Angola to Delagoa Bay)

Family: Champsodontidae – Gapers
Gaper, Champsodon capensis (Regan, 1908) (Cape of Good Hope to Durban)

Family: Chiasmodontidae – Swallowers
Chiasmodon niger Johnson, 1863 (Tropical/subtropical in the three major oceans)
Kali macrodon (Norman, 1929) (Tropical/subtropical in the three major oceans, taken off Cape Town and Natal)

Family: Uranoscopidae – Stargazers
Spotted stargazer, Pleuroscopus pseudodorsalis Barnard, 1927 (off Table Bay and Algoa Bay)

Suborder: Zoarcoidei

Family: Zoarcidae – Eelpouts
Lycodes agulhensis Andriashev, 1959 (Cap Blanc, Mauretania to Agulhas Bank)
Lycodonus vermiformis Barnard, 1927 (off Cape Point)
Melanostigma gelatinosum Günther, 1881 (off Cape Town)

Order Saccopharyngiformes
Family Cyematidae – arrow eels
Cyema atrum Günther, 1878 (Off southwest coast)
Bobtail snipe eel, Neocyema erythrosoma Castle, 1978 (west of Cape Town)

Order Scorpaeniformes

Suborder: Cottoidei

Family: Psychrolutidae – fatheads
Cottunculus spinosus, Gilchrist, 1906 (off Cape Point)

Family: Liparidae – snailfishes
Careproctus albescens Barnard, 1927 (off Cape Point)
Paraliparis australis Gilchrist, 1904 (off Cape Point)
Paraliparis copei Goode & Bean, 1896 (Northwest Atlantic, Azores and South Africa. off Cape Point)
Paraliparis micruris (Barnard, 1927) (Cape of Good Hope, southern Indian Ocean and South Pacific)

Suborder: Scorpaenoidei

Family: Congiopodidae – horsefishes
Spinenose horsefish, Congiopodus spinifer (Smith, 1839) (Walvis Bay to Natal)
Smooth horsefish, Congiopodus torvus (Gronovius, 1772) (Namibia to Pondoland)(Walvis Bay to KZN)

Family: Scorpaenidae
Bigscale scorpionfish, Scorpaena scrofa Linnaeus, 1758 (Algoa Bay to Natal)(False Bay to KZN)

Family: Sebastidae
Jacopever, Helicolenus dactylopterus (Delaroche, 1809) (Walvis Bay to Natal)
False jacopever, Sebastes capensis (Gmelin, 1788) (Cape to Saldanha Bay)
Cape scorpionfish, Trachyscorpia capensis (Cape to St Helena Bay)

Family: Tetrarogidae – waspfishes
Smoothskin scorpionfish, Coccotropsis gymnoderma (Gilchrist, 1906) (Cape to Algoa bay)(Cape Peninsula to Algoa Bay)

Family: Triglidae – gurnards
Cape gurnard, Chelidonichthys capensis (Cuvier, 1829) (Cape Fria to Maputo)
Bluefin gurnard, Chelidonichthys kumu (Cuvier, 1829) (Cape Point to Delagoa Bay)(West coast of Cape Peninsula to Algoa Bay, also Indo-west Pacific)
Lesser gurnard, Chelidonichthys queketti (Regan, 1904) (Table Bay to Natal)

Order Siluriformes – catfishes
Family Ariidae – sea catfishes
Black seacatfish, Galeichthys ater Castelnau, 1861 (south coast to Port Alfred)
White seacatfish, Galeichthys feliceps Valenciennes, 1840 (Walvis Bay to Natal)

Order Stomiiformes

Family Gonostomatidae – bristlemouths
Cyclothone acclinidens Garman, 1899 (off Cape Point; tropical/subtropical in all 3 major oceans)
Veiled anglemouth, Cyclothone microdon (Günther, 1878) (Saldanha Bay to Mossel Bay; all 3 major oceans)
Bicolored bristlemouth, tan bristlemouth Cyclothone pallida Brauer, 1902 (all 3 major oceans)
Diplophos rebainsi Krefft and Parin, 1972 (off south western Cape coast; southern Atlantic and south-eastern Pacific Oceans)
Diplophos taenia Günther, 1873 (all 3 major oceans; all around SA coast)
Gonostoma denudatum Rafineque, 1810 (Temperate/subtropical Atlantic; off southern Africa to ca. 37°S)
Sigmops bathyphilus (Vaillant, 1884), syn. Gonostoma bathyphilum (off Cape Point; temperate/subtropical Atlantic and Pacific oceans)

Family Phosichthyidae – lightfishes
Ichthyococcus australis Mukhacheva, 1980 (circumglobal in subtropical convergence region of southern hemisphere with records between 30° and 40°S in Atlantic sector of our region)
Slender lightfish Vinciguerria attenuata (Cocco, 1838) (off Cape Point; all 3 major oceans)

Family Sternoptychidae – hatchetfishes
Muller's pearlsides, Maurolicus muelleri (Gmelin, 1788) (all oceans, more common in colder regions)
Valenciennellus tripunctulatus (Esmark, 1871), syn. Valenciennellus tripunctatus (all oceans, tropical, subtropical and temperate waters)
Atlantic silver hatchetfish, longspine silver hatchetfish, Argyropelecus aculeatus Valenciennes, 1849 (worldwide in tropical and temperate seas)
Greater silver hatchetfish, Argyropelecus gigas Norman, 1930 (southeast of Cape of Good Hope; Indian Ocean to 40°S and south Atlantic to 38°S)
Short silver hatchetfishArgyropelecus hemigymnus Cocco, 1829 (worldwide distribution, common in SA waters to 35°S)
Transparent hatchetfish, Sternoptyx diaphana Hermann, 1781 (worldwide in tropical and temperate seas)
Sternoptyx pseudodiaphana Borodulina, 1977 (Indian Ocean south of 35°S; circumglobal in Southern Ocean; Benguela current)

Family: Stomiidae 
Astronesthes boulengeri Gilchrist, 1902 (southeast of Cape Point, circumpolar between 30° and 40°S)
Astronesthes indicus Brauer, 1902 (circumglobal in tropical waters, taken between 33° and 35°S on Atlantic side)
Bathophilus digitatus (Welsh, 1923) (single specimen from off Cape Town; North Atlantic, Indian and Pacific oceans)
Bathophilus longipinnis (Pappenheim, 1914) (off Cape Town; occurs widely in all 3 major oceans)
Bathophilus nigerrimus Giglioli, 1884 (off Cape Town and off Port Elizabeth to Mozambique Channel)
Chauliodus sloani Bloch and Schneider, 1801 (offshore throughout southern Africa)
Echiostoma barbatum Lowe, 1843 (off Cape Town, southeast of Algoa Bay; widespread in tropical/subtropical waters of all oceans)
Eustomias bulbornatus Gibbs, 1960 (south and west of Cape of Good Hope; tropical Indian and Pacific oceans)
Eustomias filifer (Gilchrist, 1906) (off Cape Point; tropical and subtropical Atlantic)
Eustomias grandibulbus Gibbs, Clarke and Gomon, 1983 (off Cape Town)
Eustomias lipochirus Regan and Trewavas, 1930 (2 specimens from south west of Cape of Good Hope; Tropical/subtropical Atlantic)
Eustomias schmidti Regan and Trewavas, 1930 (off Cape Town; occurs widely in all 3 major oceans)
Eustomias trewavasae Norman, 1930 (circumglobal between about 33° and 40°S)
Leptostomias gladiator (Zugmayer, 1911) (tropical, subtropical and temperate Atlantic, also Indian and Pacific oceans)
Melanostomias niger Gilchrist and von Bonde, 1924 (widespread in Atlantic between 20° and 50°S)
Melanostomias valdiviae Brauer, 1902 (off Cape Town and northeast of Durban; all 3 major oceans)
Opostomias micripnus (Günther, 1878) (northwest of Cape Town; occurs across the Atlantic, Pacific and possibly Indian Ocean south of about 33°S) (syn. Opostomias gibsonpacei Barnard, 1948)
Pachystomias microdon (Günther, 1878) (off Western Cape coast; widespread in all 3 major oceans)(Günther, 1878)
Photonectes braueri (Zugmayer, 1913) (off Cape Town; Atlantic and western Indian Ocean)
Photonectes parvimanus Regan and Trewavas, 1930 (off west coast; north Atlantic and central Pacific)
Trigonolampa miriceps Regan and Trewavas, 1930 (off west coast; apparently circumglobal in Southern Ocean south of 30°S)
Boa dragonfish, scaly dragonfish, Stomias boa boa (Risso, 1810) (offshore throughout southern Africa)
Stomias longibarbatus (Brauer, 1902), syn. Macrostomias longibarbatus (taken once off Cape of Good Hope, widespread in subtropical and tropical Atlantic and tropical Indian and Pacific oceans)

Order Syngnathiformes

Family Centriscidae – snipefishes and shrimpfishes 
 Banded snipefish, Centriscops obliquus Waite, 1911 (Cape Columbine to False Bay)
 Slender snipefish, Macroramphosus scolopax (Linnaeus, 1758) (Table Bay to Durban)

Family Fistulariidae – flutemouths
 Serrate flutemouth, Fistularia petimba Lacepède, 1803 (Atlantic, Indian and western Pacific oceans; east coast of Africa south to Mossel Bay; also reported from Walvis Bay and False Bay)

Family Syngnathidae – seahorses and pipefishes
 Longsnout pipefish, Syngnathus temminckii Kaup, 1856 (Namibia to northern KwaZulu-Natal)

Missing fish
Family Tetraodontidae – puffers
Evil-eye blaasop, Amblyrhynchotes honckenii(Bloch, 1785)(False Bay to Delagoa Bay, Indo-West Pacific)

 Family Soleidae – soles
Cape sole, Heteromycteris capensis (Both sides of Cape Peninsula)
Lace sole, Synapturichthys kleini (Both sides of the Cape Peninsula)
Lemon sole, Barnardichthys fulvomarginata syn. Solea fulvomarginata (False Bay and eastwards)

Reptiles

Vagrant turtles

Birds

Class Aves – birds
Order Charadriiformes
Family:	Haematopodidae
African oystercatcher, Haemotopus moquini (Bonaparte, 1856) (Lüderitz, Namibia to Mazeppa Bay, Eastern Cape, South Africa)
Order Sphenisciformes – Penguins
Family: Spheniscidae
Jackass penguin or African penguin, Spheniscus demersus (Linnaeus 1758),(Namibia to Algoa Bay)
Order Suliformes
Family Sulidae – gannets and boobies
Cape gannet, Morus capensis (Lichtenstein, 1823), (Breeding: three islands off Namibia and three islands off South Africa. Otherwise: coastal waters off the Gulf of Guinea to Mozambique)
Family: Phalacrocoracidae – Cormorants 
Crowned cormorant, Microcarbo coronatus (Wahlberg, 1855), (Swakopmund to Cape Agulhas)
Cape cormorant, Phalacrocorax capensis Sparrman, 1788, (Breeding: Namibia to southern Cape Province, Otherwise: Mouth of the Congo to Mozambique)
Bank cormorant, Phalacrocorax neglectus (Wahlberg, 1855), (Namibia and the west coast of South Africa)

others?

Mammals

Order Carnivora
Suborder Pinnipedia – seals
Family Otariidae – eared seals
South African fur seal, Arctocephalus pusillus pusillus (Schreber, 1775) (Northern Namibia to Port Elizabeth, subspecies endemic)

Family Phocidae – true seals
Southern elephant seal, Mirounga leonina Linnaeus, 1758 (Antarctica, occasionally washed north by storms)

Family Mustelidae – weasels and others
Subfamily Lutrinae – otters
Cape clawless otter, Aonyx capensis (Schinz, 1821) (most of Africa with access to fresh water)

Order Cetacea 
Suborder Mysticeti 
Family Balaenidae – right whales
Southern right whale, Eubalaena australis Desmoulins, 1822 (pelagic, Southern Ocean, winters along the South African coast from central Namibia to southern Mozambique )

Family Balaenopteridae, – rorquals
Humpback whale Megaptera novaeangliae Borowski, 1781 (pelagic open ocean, migrating from Antarctic waters to tropical waters in winter)
Bryde's whale, Balaenoptera edeni Anderson, 1879 (globally in tropics and sub-tropics)

Suborder Odontoceti – toothed whales
Superfamily Delphinoidea
Family Delphinidae – oceanic dolphins
Long-beaked common dolphin, Delphinus capensis Gray, 1828 (warm-temperate and tropical waters)
Bottlenosed dolphin, Tursiops truncatus Montagu, 1821 (pelagic open ocean though not polar seas)
Dusky dolphin, Sagmatias obscurus Gray, 1828 (Namibian coast to the Cape Peninsula)
Killer whale, orca, Orcinus orca Linnaeus, 1758 (pelagic, all oceans)

Geographical position of places mentioned in species ranges
Agulhas Bank, Western Cape 
Algoa Bay, Eastern Cape, 

Bashee River, Eastern Cape 
Beira, Mozambique

Blaauwberg, Western Cape, 

Cape Agulhas, Western Cape, 
Cape Columbine, Western Cape, 
Cape Frio, Namibia, 
Cape of Good Hope, Western Cape,  (sometimes used historically to refer to the Cape Province, or South Africa)
Cape Peninsula, Western Cape 

Coffee Bay, Eastern Cape,  

Dassen Island, Western Cape,  
Dassie Point, False Bay,

Delagoa Bay, Mozambique, 

Doring Bay (Doringbaai), Western Cape, 
Durban, KwaZulu-Natal, 

East London, Eastern Cape, 
Elands Bay, Western Cape,  
False Bay, Western Cape, 

Gordon's Bay Western Cape 

Hermanus, Western Cape, 

Hout Bay, Cape Peninsula, Western Cape, 
Inhaca, Mozambique, 

Jeffrey's Bay, Eastern Cape,  

Kei River, Eastern Cape, 

Knysna, Western Cape, 
Kommetjie, Western Cape, 

Kosi Bay, Kwa-Zulu-Natal, 

Lamberts Bay, Western Cape, 

Langebaan Lagoon, Western Cape, 
Limpopo River, Mozambique, 

Lüderitz, Namibia, 
Mabibi, (Mbibi) Kwa-Zulu-Natal, 

Mazeppa Bay, Eastern Cape, 
Melkbosstrand, Western Cape, 
Miller's Point, Cape Peninsula, 

Mossel Bay, Western Cape, 

Muizenberg, False Bay, Western Cape, 
Noordhoek, Cape Peninsula, Western Cape, 

Olifants River (Western Cape) 
Onrust River, Western Cape, 
Orange River, Northern Cape, 

Plettenberg Bay, Western Cape, 

Port Alfred, Eastern Cape, 

Port Elizabeth, Eastern Cape, 
Port Nolloth, Northern Cape, 
Port St. Johns, KwaZulu-Natal, 

Richards Bay, KwaZulu-Natal, 

Rooikrans, Cape Peninsula 
Saldanha Bay, Western Cape, 

Slangkop, Cape Peninsula, 
Smitswinkel Bay, False Bay, Western Cape, 
Sodwana Bay, KwaZulu-Natal, 

Storms River, Eastern Cape, 

Strandfontein, False Bay, Western Cape, 
Strandfontein, Western Cape, 
Swakopmund, Namibia, 

Table Bay, Western Cape, 

Tsitsikamma, Eastern Cape, 

Umtata River 

Vulcan Rock, Cape Peninsula, 
Walvis Bay, Namibia, 
Windmill Beach Simon's Town, Cape Peninsula, 

Xora River, Eastern Cape,

See also

References

Fauna of the Atlantic Ocean
Fauna of South Africa
Lists of biota of South Africa
Lists of animals
Marine biodiversity of South Africa